The Soviet–Afghan War was a protracted armed conflict fought in the Democratic Republic of Afghanistan from 1979 to 1989. It saw extensive fighting between the Soviet Union, the DRA and allied paramilitary groups against the Afghan mujahideen, foreign fighters, and smaller groups of anti-Soviet Maoists.

The war began after the Soviets, under the command of Leonid Brezhnev, had militarily intervened in, or launched an invasion of, Afghanistan to support the local pro-Soviet government that had been installed during Operation Storm-333. Combat took place throughout the 1980s, mostly in the Afghan countryside.

While the mujahideen were backed by various countries and organizations, the majority of their support came from Pakistan, the United States (as part of Operation Cyclone), the United Kingdom, China, Iran, and the Arab monarchies of the Persian Gulf. The American pro-mujahideen stance coincided with a sharp increase in bilateral hostilities with the Soviets during the Cold War. The conflict led to the deaths of between 562,000 and 2,000,000 Afghans, while millions more fled from the country as refugees; most externally displaced Afghans sought refuge in Pakistan and in Iran. Approximately 6.5% to 11.5% of Afghanistan's erstwhile population of 13.5 million people (per the 1979 census) is estimated to have been killed over the course of the conflict. The Soviet–Afghan War caused grave destruction throughout Afghanistan, and has also been cited by scholars as a significant factor that contributed to the dissolution of the Soviet Union, formally ending the Cold War.

The foundations of the conflict were laid by the Saur Revolution in 1978, which saw the nationwide seizure of power by the People's Democratic Party of Afghanistan (PDPA). After executing then-president Mohammed Daoud Khan and purging his supporters, the PDPA initiated a series of radical land reforms and modernization efforts throughout Afghanistan. These policies were deeply unpopular among much of the conservative rural population and established power structures, who saw the PDPA's socialism as an ideologically disruptive force against their Islamic conservatism. Widespread dismay over the new policies was exacerbated by the repressive nature of the PDPA's Democratic Republic government. By April 1979, large parts of Afghanistan had erupted in open rebellion.

In addition to civil unrest across the country, the PDPA was experiencing deep internal turmoil due to factional rivalries between the Khalqists and the Parchamites; in September 1979, PDPA General-Secretary Nur Muhammad Taraki was assassinated on orders from the PDPA's second-in-command, Hafizullah Amin. Amin's supersession of Taraki put the Khalqists at an advantage against the Parchamites, while greatly souring Afghanistan's relationship with the Soviet Union. With fears rising that Amin was planning to ally Afghanistan with the United States, Soviet leader Leonid Brezhnev led his government to deploy the 40th Army inside Afghanistan on 24 December 1979. Arriving in the capital city of Kabul, the Soviet military contingent stormed the Tajbeg Palace and assassinated Amin, subsequently installing Parchamite-affiliated Babrak Karmal as Afghanistan's new pro-Soviet leader. The decision by the Soviet Union to directly intervene in Afghanistan was based on the Brezhnev Doctrine.

Soviet troops occupied Afghanistan's major cities and all main arteries of communication, whereas the mujahideen waged guerrilla warfare in small groups across the 80% of the country that was not subject to uncontested Soviet control—almost exclusively comprising the rugged, mountainous terrain of the countryside. In addition to laying millions of landmines across Afghanistan, the Soviets used their aerial power to deal harshly with both rebels and civilians, levelling villages to deny safe haven to the mujahideen and destroying vital irrigation ditches.

Numerous sanctions and embargoes were imposed on the Soviet Union by the international community following the deployment. As bilateral tensions increased, the United States initiated the 1980 Summer Olympics boycott, and the Soviet Union later initiated the 1984 Summer Olympics boycott, with both sides leading a number of countries to withdraw from participating in the events at Moscow and Los Angeles, respectively. 

The Soviet government had initially planned to swiftly secure Afghanistan's towns and road networks, stabilize the PDPA government under loyalist Karmal, and withdraw all of their military forces in a span of six months to one year. However, they were met with fierce resistance from Afghan guerrillas and experienced great operational difficulties on the rugged mountainous terrain. By the mid-1980s, the Soviet military presence in Afghanistan had increased to approximately 115,000 troops, and fighting across the country intensified; the complication of the war effort gradually inflicted a high cost on the Soviet Union as military, economic, and political resources became increasingly exhausted. 

By mid-1987, reformist Soviet leader Mikhail Gorbachev announced that the Soviet military would begin a complete withdrawal from Afghanistan, following a series of meetings with the Afghan government that outlined a policy of "National Reconciliation" for the country. The final wave of disengagement was initiated on 15 May 1988, and on 15 February 1989, the last Soviet military column occupying Afghanistan crossed into the Uzbek SSR. With continued external Soviet backing, the PDPA government pursued a solo war effort against the mujahideen, and the conflict evolved into the Afghan Civil War. However, the deeply unpopular Afghan government lost all support as the Soviet Union itself collapsed in 1991, leading to the toppling of the PDPA's Democratic Republic at the hands of the mujahideen in 1992. 

Due to the length of the Soviet–Afghan War, it has sometimes been referred to as the "Soviet Union's Vietnam War" or as the "Bear Trap" by sources from the Western world. It has left a mixed legacy in the post-Soviet countries as well as in Afghanistan. Additionally, American support for the mujahideen in Afghanistan during the conflict is thought to have contributed to a "blowback" of unintended consequences against American interests (e.g., the September 11 attacks), which ultimately led to the United States' War in Afghanistan from 2001 until 2021. The war also had lasting impacts in Pakistan.

Naming 
In Afghanistan the war is usually called the Soviet war in Afghanistan ( Pah Afghanistan ke Shuravi Jagera,  Jang-e Shuravi dar Afghanestan). In Russia and elsewhere in the former Soviet Union it is usually called the Afghan war; it is sometimes simply referred to as "Afgan", with the understanding that this refers to the war (just as the Vietnam War is often called "Vietnam" or just Nam" in the United States). It is also internationally known as the Afghan jihad, especially by the non-Afghan volunteers of the Mujahideen.

Background

Russian interest in Central Asia 
In the 19th century, the British Empire was fearful that the Russian Empire would invade Afghanistan and use it to threaten the large British holdings in India. This regional rivalry was called the "Great Game". In 1885, Russian forces seized a disputed oasis south of the Oxus River from Afghan forces, which became known as the Panjdeh Incident, and threatened war. The border was agreed by the joint Anglo-Russian Afghan Boundary Commission of 1885–87. The Russian interest in Afghanistan continued through the Soviet era, with billions in economic and military aid sent to Afghanistan between 1955 and 1978.

Following Amanullah Khan's ascent to the throne in 1919 and the subsequent Third Anglo-Afghan War, the British conceded Afghanistan's full independence. King Amanullah afterwards wrote to Moscow (now under Bolshevik control) desiring for permanent friendly relations. Vladimir Lenin replied by congratulating the Afghans for their defence against the British, and a treaty of friendship between Afghanistan and the Soviet Union was finalized in 1921. The Soviets saw possibilities in an alliance with Afghanistan against the United Kingdom, such as using it as a base for a revolutionary advance towards British-controlled India.

The Red Army intervened in Afghanistan against the Basmachi movement in 1929 and 1930 to support the ousted king Amanullah, as part of the Afghan Civil War (1928–1929). The Basmachi movement had originated in a 1916 Muslim revolt against Russian conscription during WWI, bolstered by Turkish general Enver Pasha during the Caucasus campaign. The Red Army deployed around 120,000–160,000 troops in Central Asia, a force similar to the peak strength of the Soviet intervention in Afghanistan in size. By 1926–1928, the Basmachis were mostly defeated by the Soviets, and Central Asia was incorporated into the Soviet Union. In 1929, the Basmachi rebellion reignited, associated with anti-collectivization riots. Basmachis crossed over into Afghanistan under Ibrahim Bek, which gave a pretext for the Red Army operations in 1929 and 1930.

Soviet–Afghan relations post-1920s 

The Soviet Union (USSR) had been a major power broker and influential mentor in Afghan politics, its involvement ranging from civil-military infrastructure to Afghan society. Since 1947, Afghanistan had been under the influence of the Soviet government and received large amounts of aid, economic assistance, military equipment training and military hardware from the Soviet Union. Economic assistance and aid had been provided to Afghanistan as early as 1919, shortly after the Russian Revolution and when the regime was facing the Russian Civil War. Provisions were given in the form of small arms, ammunition, a few aircraft, and (according to debated Soviet sources) a million gold rubles to support the resistance during the Third Anglo-Afghan War in 1919. In 1942, the USSR again moved to strengthen the Afghan Armed Forces by providing small arms and aircraft, and establishing training centers in Tashkent (Uzbek Soviet Socialist Republic). Soviet-Afghan military cooperation began on a regular basis in 1956, and further agreements were made in the 1970s, which saw the USSR send advisers and specialists. The Soviets also had interests in the energy resources of Afghanistan, including exploring oil and natural gas from the 1950s and 1960s. The USSR began to import Afghan gas from 1968 onward.

Afghanistan-Pakistan border 

In the 19th century, with the Czarist Russian forces moving closer to the Pamir Mountains, near the border with British India, civil servant Mortimer Durand was sent to outline a border, likely in order to control the Khyber Pass. The demarcation of the mountainous region resulted in an agreement, signed with the Afghan Emir, Abdur Rahman Khan, in 1893. It became known as the Durand Line.

In 1947, the Prime Minister of the Kingdom of Afghanistan, Mohammed Daoud Khan, rejected the Durand Line, which was accepted as an international border by successive Afghan governments for over half a century. 

The British Raj also came to an end, and the Dominion of Pakistan gained independence from British India and inherited the Durand Line as its frontier with Afghanistan. 

Under the regime of Daoud Khan, Afghanistan had hostile relations with both Pakistan and Iran. Like all previous Afghan rulers since 1901, Daoud Khan also wanted to emulate Emir Abdur Rahman Khan and unite his divided country.

To do that, he needed a popular cause to unite the Afghan people divided along tribal lines, and a modern, well equipped Afghan army which would be used to suppress anyone who would oppose the Afghan government. His Pashtunistan policy was to annex Pashtun areas of Pakistan, and he used this policy for his own benefit.

Daoud Khan's irredentist foreign policy to reunite the Pashtun homeland caused much tension with Pakistan, a state that allied itself with the United States. The policy had also angered the non-Pashtun population of Afghanistan, and similarly, the Pashtun population in Pakistan were also not interested in having their areas being annexed by Afghanistan. In 1951, the U.S. State Department urged Afghanistan to drop its claim against Pakistan and accept the Durand Line.

1960s–1970s: Proxy war 

In 1954, the United States began selling arms to its ally Pakistan, while refusing an Afghan request to buy arms, out of fear that the Afghans would use the weapons against Pakistan. As a consequence, Afghanistan, though officially neutral in the Cold War, drew closer to India and the Soviet Union, which were willing to sell them weapons. In 1962, China defeated India in a border war, and as a result, China formed an alliance with Pakistan against their common enemy, India, pushing Afghanistan even closer to India and the Soviet Union.

In 1960 and 1961, the Afghan Army, on the orders of Daoud Khan following his policy of Pashtun irredentism, made two unsuccessful incursions into Pakistan's Bajaur District. In both cases, the Afghan army was routed, suffering heavy casualties. In response, Pakistan closed its consulate in Afghanistan and blocked all trade routes through the Pakistan–Afghanistan border. This damaged Afghanistan's economy and Daoud's regime was pushed towards closer alliance with the Soviet Union for trade. However, these stopgap measures were not enough to compensate the loss suffered by Afghanistan's economy because of the border closure. As a result of continued resentment against Daoud's autocratic rule, close ties with the Soviet Union and economic downturn, Daoud Khan was forced to resign by the King of Afghanistan, Mohammed Zahir Shah. Following his resignation, the crisis between Pakistan and Afghanistan was resolved and Pakistan re-opened the trade routes. After the removal of Daoud Khan, the King installed a new prime minister and started creating a balance in Afghanistan's relation with the West and the Soviet Union, which angered the Soviet Union.

Ten years later, in 1973, Mohammed Daoud Khan, supported by Soviet-trained Afghan army officers, seized power from the King in a bloodless coup, and established the first Afghan republic. Following his return to power, Daoud revived his Pashtunistan policy and for the first time started proxy warring against Pakistan by supporting anti-Pakistani groups and providing them with arms, training and sanctuaries. The Pakistani government of prime minister Zulfikar Ali Bhutto was alarmed by this. The Soviet Union also supported Daoud Khan's militancy against Pakistan as they wanted to weaken Pakistan, which was an ally of both the United States and China. However, it did not openly try to create problems for Pakistan as that would damage the Soviet Union's relations with other Islamic countries, hence it relied on Daoud Khan to weaken Pakistan. They had the same thought regarding Iran, another major U.S. ally. The Soviet Union also believed that the hostile behaviour of Afghanistan against Pakistan and Iran could alienate Afghanistan from the west, and Afghanistan would be forced into a closer relationship with the Soviet Union. The pro-Soviet Afghans (such as the People's Democratic Party of Afghanistan (PDPA)) also supported Daoud Khan hostility towards Pakistan, as they believed that a conflict with Pakistan would promote Afghanistan to seek aid from the Soviet Union. As a result, the pro-Soviet Afghans would be able to establish their influence over Afghanistan.

In response to Afghanistan's proxy war, Pakistan started supporting Afghans who were critical of Daoud Khan's policies. Bhutto authorized a covert operation under MI's Major-General Naseerullah Babar. In 1974, Bhutto authorized another secret operation in Kabul where the Inter-Services Intelligence (ISI) and the Air Intelligence of Pakistan (AI) extradited Burhanuddin Rabbani, Gulbuddin Hekmatyar and Ahmad Shah Massoud to Peshawar, amid fear that Rabbani, Hekmatyar and Massoud might be assassinated by Daoud. According to Baber, Bhutto's operation was an excellent idea and it had hard-hitting impact on Daoud and his government, which forced Daoud to increase his desire to make peace with Bhutto. Pakistan's goal was to overthrow Daoud's regime and establish an Islamist theocracy in its place. The first ever ISI operation in Afghanistan took place in 1975, supporting militants from the Jamiat-e Islami party, led by Ahmad Shah Massoud, attempting to overthrow the government. They started their rebellion in the Panjshir valley, but lack of support along with government forces easily defeating them made it a failure, and a sizable portion of the insurgents sought refuge in Pakistan where they enjoyed the support of Bhutto's government.

The 1975 rebellion, though unsuccessful, shook President Daoud Khan and made him realize that a friendly Pakistan was in his best interests. He started improving relations with Pakistan and made state visits there in 1976 and 1978. During the 1978 visit, he agreed to stop supporting anti-Pakistan militants and to expel any remaining militants in Afghanistan. In 1975, Daoud Khan established his own party, the National Revolutionary Party of Afghanistan, and outlawed all other parties. He then started removing members of its Parcham wing from government positions, including the ones who had supported his coup, and started replacing them with familiar faces from Kabul's traditional government elites. Daoud also started reducing his dependence on the Soviet Union. As a consequence of Daoud's actions, Afghanistan's relations with the Soviet Union deteriorated. In 1978, after witnessing India's nuclear test, Smiling Buddha, Daoud Khan initiated a military buildup to counter Pakistan's armed forces and Iranian military influence in Afghan politics.

Saur Revolution of 1978 

The Marxist People's Democratic Party of Afghanistan's strength grew considerably after its foundation. In 1967, the PDPA split into two rival factions, the Khalq (Masses) faction headed by Nur Muhammad Taraki and the Parcham (Flag) faction led by Babrak Karmal. Symbolic of the different backgrounds of the two factions were the fact that Taraki's father was a poor Pashtun herdsman while Karmal's father was a Tajik general in the Royal Afghan Army. More importantly, the radical Khalq faction believed in rapidly transforming Afghanistan, by violence if necessary, from a feudal system into a Communist society, while the moderate Parcham faction favored a more gradualist and gentler approach, arguing that Afghanistan was simply not ready for Communism and would not be for some time. The Parcham faction favored building up the PDPA as a mass party in support of the Daoud Khan government, while the Khalq faction were organized in the Leninist style as a small, tightly organized elite group, allowing the latter to enjoy ascendancy over the former. In 1971, the U.S. Embassy in Kabul reported that there had been increasing leftist activity in the country, attributed to disillusionment of social and economic conditions, and the poor response from the Kingdom's leadership. It added that the PDPA was "perhaps the most disgruntled and organized of the country’s leftist groups."

Intense opposition from factions of the PDPA was sparked by the repression imposed on them by Daoud's regime and the death of a leading PDPA member, Mir Akbar Khyber. The mysterious circumstances of Khyber's death sparked massive anti-Daoud demonstrations in Kabul, which resulted in the arrest of several prominent PDPA leaders. On 27 April 1978, the Afghan Army, which had been sympathetic to the PDPA cause, overthrew and executed Daoud along with members of his family. The Finnish scholar Raimo Väyrynen wrote about the so-called "Saur Revolution": "There is a multitude of speculations on the real nature of this coup. The reality appears to be that it was inspired first of all by domestic economic and political concerns and that the Soviet Union did not play any role in the Saur Revolution". After this the Democratic Republic of Afghanistan (DRA) was formed. Nur Muhammad Taraki, General Secretary of the People's Democratic Party of Afghanistan, became Chairman of the Revolutionary Council and Chairman of the Council of Ministers of the newly established Democratic Republic of Afghanistan. On 5 December 1978, a treaty of friendship was signed between the Soviet Union and Afghanistan.

"Red Terror" of the revolutionary government 

After the revolution, Taraki assumed the leadership, Prime Ministership and General Secretaryship of the PDPA. As before in the party, the government never referred to itself as "communist". The government was divided along factional lines, with Taraki and Deputy Prime Minister Hafizullah Amin of the Khalq faction pitted against Parcham leaders such as Babrak Karmal. Though the new regime promptly allied itself to the Soviet Union, many Soviet diplomats believed that the Khalqi plans to transform Afghanistan would provoke a rebellion from the general population that was deeply socially and religiously conservative. Immediately after coming to power, the Khalqis began to persecute the Parchamis, not the least because the Soviet Union favored the Parchami faction whose "go slow" plans were felt to be better suited for Afghanistan, thereby leading the Khaqis to eliminate their rivals so the Soviets would have no other choice but to back them. Within the PDPA, conflicts resulted in exiles, purges and executions of Parcham members. The Khalq state executed between 10,000 and 27,000 people, mostly at Pul-e-Charkhi prison, prior to the Soviet intervention. Political scientist Olivier Roy estimated between 50,000 and 100,000 people disappeared during the Taraki–Amin period.

During its first 18 months of rule, the PDPA applied a Soviet-style program of modernizing reforms, many of which were viewed by conservatives as opposing Islam. Decrees setting forth changes in marriage customs and land reform were not received well by a population deeply immersed in tradition and Islam, particularly by the powerful landowners harmed economically by the abolition of usury (although usury is prohibited in Islam) and the cancellation of farmers' debts. The new government also enhanced women's rights, sought a rapid eradication of illiteracy and promoted Afghanistan's ethnic minorities, although these programs appear to have had an effect only in the urban areas. By mid-1978, a rebellion started, with rebels attacking the local military garrison in the Nuristan region of eastern Afghanistan and soon civil war spread throughout the country. In September 1979, Deputy Prime Minister Hafizullah Amin seized power, arresting and killing Taraki. More than two months of instability overwhelmed Amin's regime as he moved against his opponents in the PDPA and the growing rebellion.

Affairs with the USSR after the revolution 

Even before the revolutionaries came to power, Afghanistan was "a militarily and politically neutral nation, effectively dependent on the Soviet Union." A treaty, signed in December 1978, allowed the Democratic Republic to call upon the Soviet Union for military support.

Following the Herat uprising, the first major sign of anti-regime resistance, General Secretary Taraki contacted Alexei Kosygin, chairman of the USSR Council of Ministers, and asked for "practical and technical assistance with men and armament". Kosygin was unfavorable to the proposal on the basis of the negative political repercussions such an action would have for his country, and he rejected all further attempts by Taraki to solicit Soviet military aid in Afghanistan. Following Kosygin's rejection, Taraki requested aid from Leonid Brezhnev, the general secretary of the Communist Party of the Soviet Union and Soviet head of state, who warned Taraki that full Soviet intervention "would only play into the hands of our enemies – both yours and ours". Brezhnev also advised Taraki to ease up on the drastic social reforms and to seek broader support for his regime.

In 1979, Taraki attended a conference of the Non-Aligned Movement in Havana, Cuba. On his way back, he stopped in Moscow on 20 March and met with Brezhnev, Soviet Foreign Minister Andrei Gromyko and other Soviet officials. It was rumoured that Karmal was present at the meeting in an attempt to reconcile Taraki's Khalq faction and the Parcham against Amin and his followers. At the meeting, Taraki was successful in negotiating some Soviet support, including the redeployment of two Soviet armed divisions at the Soviet-Afghan border, the sending of 500 military and civilian advisers and specialists and the immediate delivery of Soviet armed equipment sold at 25 percent below the original price; however, the Soviets were not pleased about the developments in Afghanistan and Brezhnev impressed upon Taraki the need for party unity. Despite reaching this agreement with Taraki, the Soviets continued to be reluctant to intervene further in Afghanistan and repeatedly refused Soviet military intervention within Afghan borders during Taraki's rule as well as later during Amin's short rule.

Taraki and Amin's regime even attempted to eliminate Parcham's leader Babrak Karmal. After being relieved of his duties as ambassador, he remained in Czechoslovakia in exile, fearing for his life if he returned as the regime requested. He and his family were protected by the Czechoslovak StB; files from January 1979 revealed information that Afghanistan sent KHAD spies to Czechoslovakia to find and assassinate Karmal.

Initiation of the rebellion 

In 1978, the Taraki government initiated a series of reforms, including a radical modernization of the traditional Islamic civil law, especially marriage law, aimed at "uprooting feudalism" in Afghan society. The government brooked no opposition to the reforms and responded with violence to unrest. Between April 1978 and the Soviet Intervention of December 1979, thousands of prisoners, perhaps as many as 27,000, were executed at the notorious Pul-e-Charkhi prison, including many village mullahs and headmen. Other members of the traditional elite, the religious establishment and intelligentsia fled the country.

Large parts of the country went into open rebellion. The Parcham Government claimed that 11,000 were executed during the Amin/Taraki period in response to the revolts. The revolt began in October among the Nuristani tribes of the Kunar Valley in the northeastern part of the country near the border with Pakistan, and rapidly spread among the other ethnic groups. By the spring of 1979, 24 of the 28 provinces had suffered outbreaks of violence. The rebellion began to take hold in the cities: in March 1979 in Herat, rebels led by Ismail Khan revolted. Between 3,000 and 5,000 people were killed and wounded during the Herat revolt. Some 100 Soviet citizens and their families were killed. By August 1979, up to 165,000 Afghans had fled across the border to Pakistan. The main reason the revolt spread so widely was the disintegration of the Afghan army in a series of insurrections. The numbers of the Afghan army fell from 110,000 men in 1978 to 25,000 by 1980. The U.S. embassy in Kabul cabled to Washington the army was melting away “like an ice floe in a tropical sea”. According to scholar Gilles Dorronsoro, it was the violence of the state rather than its reforms that caused the uprisings.

Pakistan–U.S. relations and rebel aid 
Pakistani intelligence officials began privately lobbying the U.S. and its allies to send materiel assistance to the Islamist insurgents. Pakistani President Muhammad Zia-ul-Haq's ties with the U.S. had been strained during Jimmy Carter's presidency due to Pakistan's nuclear program and the execution of Zulfikar Ali Bhutto in April 1979, but Carter told National Security Adviser Zbigniew Brzezinski and Secretary of State Cyrus Vance as early as January 1979 that it was vital to "repair our relationships with Pakistan" in light of the unrest in Iran. According to former Central Intelligence Agency (CIA) official Robert Gates, "the Carter administration turned to CIA ... to counter Soviet and Cuban aggression in the Third World, particularly beginning in mid-1979." In March 1979, "CIA sent several covert action options relating to Afghanistan to the SCC [Special Coordination Committee]" of the United States National Security Council. At a 30 March meeting, U.S. Department of Defense representative Walter B. Slocombe "asked if there was value in keeping the Afghan insurgency going, 'sucking the Soviets into a Vietnamese quagmire? When asked to clarify this remark, Slocombe explained: "Well, the whole idea was that if the Soviets decided to strike at this tar baby [Afghanistan] we had every interest in making sure that they got stuck." Yet a 5 April memo from National Intelligence Officer Arnold Horelick warned: "Covert action would raise the costs to the Soviets and inflame Moslem opinion against them in many countries. The risk was that a substantial U.S. covert aid program could raise the stakes and induce the Soviets to intervene more directly and vigorously than otherwise intended."

In May 1979, U.S. officials secretly began meeting with rebel leaders through Pakistani government contacts. After additional meetings Carter signed two presidential findings in July 1979 permitting the CIA to spend $695,000 on non-military assistance (e.g., "cash, medical equipment, and radio transmitters") and on a propaganda campaign targeting the Soviet-backed leadership of the DRA, which (in the words of Steve Coll) "seemed at the time a small beginning."

Soviet deployment, 1979–1980 

The Amin government, having secured a treaty in December 1978 that allowed them to call on Soviet forces, repeatedly requested the introduction of troops in Afghanistan in the spring and summer of 1979. They requested Soviet troops to provide security and to assist in the fight against the mujahideen ("Those engaged in jihad") rebels. After the killing of Soviet technicians in Herat by rioting mobs, the Soviet government sold several Mi-24 helicopters to the Afghan military, and increased the number of military advisers in the country to 3,000. On 14 April 1979, the Afghan government requested that the USSR send 15 to 20 helicopters with their crews to Afghanistan, and on 16 June, the Soviet government responded and sent a detachment of tanks, BMPs, and crews to guard the government in Kabul and to secure the Bagram and Shindand air bases. In response to this request, an airborne battalion, commanded by Lieutenant Colonel A. Lomakin, arrived at Bagram on 7 July. They arrived without their combat gear, disguised as technical specialists. They were the personal bodyguards for General Secretary Taraki. The paratroopers were directly subordinate to the senior Soviet military advisor and did not interfere in Afghan politics. Several leading politicians at the time such as Alexei Kosygin and Andrei Gromyko were against intervention.

After a month, the Afghan requests were no longer for individual crews and subunits, but for regiments and larger units. In July, the Afghan government requested that two motorized rifle divisions be sent to Afghanistan. The following day, they requested an airborne division in addition to the earlier requests. They repeated these requests and variants to these requests over the following months right up to December 1979. However, the Soviet government was in no hurry to grant them.

Based on information from the KGB, Soviet leaders felt that Prime Minister Hafizullah Amin's actions had destabilized the situation in Afghanistan. Following his initial coup against and killing of Taraki, the KGB station in Kabul warned Moscow that Amin's leadership would lead to "harsh repressions, and as a result, the activation and consolidation of the opposition."

The Soviets established a special commission on Afghanistan, comprising the KGB chairman Yuri Andropov, Boris Ponomarev from the Central Committee and Dmitry Ustinov, the Minister of Defence. In late April 1979, the committee reported that Amin was purging his opponents, including Soviet loyalists, that his loyalty to Moscow was in question and that he was seeking diplomatic links with Pakistan and possibly the People's Republic of China (which at the time had poor relations with the Soviet Union). Of specific concern were Amin's secret meetings with the U.S. chargé d'affaires, J. Bruce Amstutz, which, while never amounting to any agreement between Amin and the United States, sowed suspicion in the Kremlin.

Information obtained by the KGB from its agents in Kabul provided the last arguments to eliminate Amin. Supposedly, two of Amin's guards killed the former General Secretary Nur Muhammad Taraki with a pillow, and Amin himself was suspected to be a CIA agent. The latter, however, is still disputed, with Amin repeatedly demonstrating friendliness toward the various delegates of the Soviet Union who would arrive in Afghanistan. Soviet General Vasily Zaplatin, a political advisor of Premier Brezhnev at the time, claimed that four of General Secretary Taraki's ministers were responsible for the destabilization. However, Zaplatin failed to emphasize this in discussions and was not heard.

During meetings between General Secretary Taraki and Soviet leaders in March 1979, the Soviets promised political support and to send military equipment and technical specialists, but upon repeated requests by Taraki for direct Soviet intervention, the leadership adamantly opposed him; reasons included that they would be met with "bitter resentment" from the Afghan people, that intervening in another country's civil war would hand a propaganda victory to their opponents, and Afghanistan's overall inconsequential weight in international affairs, in essence realizing they had little to gain by taking over a country with a poor economy, unstable government, and population hostile to outsiders. However, as the situation continued to deteriorate from May–December 1979, Moscow changed its mind on dispatching Soviet troops. The reasons for this complete turnabout are not entirely clear, and several speculative arguments include: the grave internal situation and inability for the Afghan government; the effects of the Iranian Revolution that brought an Islamic theocracy into power, leading to fears that religious fanaticism would spread through Afghanistan and into Soviet Muslim Central Asian republics; Taraki's murder and replacement by Amin, who the Soviets feared could become aligned with the Americans and provide them with a new strategic position after the loss of Iran; and the deteriorating ties with the United States after NATO's two-track missile deployment decision and the failure of Congress to ratify the SALT II treaty, creating the impression that détente was "already effectively dead."

The British journalist Patrick Brogan wrote in 1989: "The simplest explanation is probably the best. They got sucked into Afghanistan much as the United States got sucked into Vietnam, without clearly thinking through the consequences, and wildly underestimating the hostility they would arouse". By the fall of 1979, the Amin regime was collapsing with morale in the Afghan Army having fallen to rock-bottom levels while the mujahideen had taken control of much of the countryside. The general consensus amongst Afghan experts at the time was that it was not a question of if, but when the mujahideen would take Kabul.

In October 1979, a KGB Spetsnaz force Zenith covertly dispatched a group of specialists to determine the potential reaction from local Afghans of a presence of Soviet troops there. They concluded that deploying troops would be unwise and could lead to war, but this was reportedly ignored by the KGB chairman Yuri Andropov. A Spetsnaz battalion of Central Asian troops, dressed in Afghan Army uniforms, was covertly deployed to Kabul between 9 and 12 November 1979. They moved a few days later to the Tajbeg Palace, where Amin was moving to.

In Moscow, Leonid Brezhnev was indecisive and waffled as he usually did when faced with a difficult decision. The three decision-makers in Moscow who pressed the hardest for an invasion in the fall of 1979 were the troika consisting of Foreign Minister Andrei Gromyko; the Chairman of KGB, Yuri Andropov and the Defense Minister Marshal Dmitry Ustinov. The principal reasons for the invasion were the belief in Moscow that Amin was a leader both incompetent and fanatical who had lost control of the situation, together with the belief that it was the United States via Pakistan who was sponsoring the Islamist insurgency in Afghanistan. Andropov, Gromyko and Ustinov all argued that if a radical Islamist regime came to power in Kabul, it would attempt to sponsor radical Islam in Soviet Central Asia, thereby requiring a preemptive strike. What was envisioned in the fall of 1979 was a short intervention under which Moscow would replace radical Khalqi Communist Amin with the moderate Parchami Communist Babrak Karmal to stabilize the situation. Contrary to the contemporary view of Brzezinski and the regional powers, access to the Persian Gulf played no role in the decision to intervene on the Soviet side.

The concerns raised by the Chief of the Red Army General Staff, Marshal Nikolai Ogarkov who warned about the possibility of a protracted guerrilla war were dismissed by the troika who insisted that any occupation of Afghanistan would be short and relatively painless. Most notably, through the diplomats of the Narkomindel at the Embassy in Kabul and the KGB officers stationed in Afghanistan were well informed about the developments in that country, but such information rarely filtered through to the decision-makers who viewed Afghanistan more in the context of the Cold War rather than understanding Afghanistan as a subject in its own right. The viewpoint that it was the United States that was fomenting the Islamic insurgency in Afghanistan with the aim of destabilizing Soviet-dominated Central Asia tended to downplay the effects of an unpopular Communist government pursuing policies that the majority of Afghans violently disliked as a generator of the insurgency and strengthened those who argued some sort of Soviet response was required to what seen as an outrageous American provocation. It was assumed in Moscow that because Pakistan (an ally of both the United States and China) was supporting the mujahideen that therefore it was ultimately the United States and China who were behind the rebellion in Afghanistan.

Amin's revolutionary government had lost credibility with virtually all of the Afghan population. A combination of chaotic administration, excessive brutality from the secret police, unpopular domestic reforms, and a deteriorating economy, along with public perceptions that the state was atheistic and anti-Islamic, all added to the government's unpopularity. After 20 months of Khalqist rule, the country deteriorated in almost every facet of life. The Soviet Union believed that without intervention, Amin's government would have been disintegrated by the resistance and the country being "lost" to a regime most likely hostile to them.

Red Army intervention and Palace coup 

On 31 October 1979, Soviet informants under orders from the inner circle of advisors under Soviet General Secretary Leonid Brezhnev relayed information to the Afghan Armed Forces for them to undergo maintenance cycles for their tanks and other crucial equipment. Meanwhile, telecommunications links to areas outside of Kabul were severed, isolating the capital. With a deteriorating security situation, large numbers of Soviet Airborne Forces joined stationed ground troops and began to land in Kabul on 25 December. Simultaneously, Amin moved the offices of the General Secretary to the Tajbeg Palace, believing this location to be more secure from possible threats. According to Colonel General Tukharinov and Merimsky, Amin was fully informed of the military movements, having requested Soviet military assistance to northern Afghanistan on 17 December. His brother and General Dmitry Chiangov met with the commander of the 40th Army before Soviet troops entered the country, to work out initial routes and locations for Soviet troops.

On 27 December 1979, 700 Soviet troops dressed in Afghan uniforms, including KGB and GRU special forces officers from the Alpha Group and Zenith Group, occupied major governmental, military and media buildings in Kabul, including their primary target, the Tajbeg Palace. The operation began at 19:00, when the KGB-led Soviet Zenith Group destroyed Kabul's communications hub, paralyzing Afghan military command. At 19:15, the assault on Tajbeg Palace began; as planned, General Secretary Hafizullah Amin was killed. Simultaneously, other objectives were occupied (e.g., the Ministry of Interior at 19:15). The operation was fully complete by the morning of 28 December 1979.

The Soviet military command at Termez, Uzbek SSR, announced on Radio Kabul that Afghanistan had been liberated from Amin's rule. According to the Soviet Politburo, they were complying with the 1978 Treaty of Friendship, Cooperation and Good Neighborliness, and Amin had been "executed by a tribunal for his crimes" by the Afghan Revolutionary Central Committee. That committee then elected as head of government former Deputy Prime Minister Babrak Karmal, who had been demoted to the relatively insignificant post of ambassador to Czechoslovakia following the Khalq takeover, and announced that it had requested Soviet military assistance.

Soviet ground forces, under the command of Marshal Sergey Sokolov, entered Afghanistan from the north on 27 December. In the morning, the 103rd Guards 'Vitebsk' Airborne Division landed at the airport at Bagram and the deployment of Soviet troops in Afghanistan was underway. The force that entered Afghanistan, in addition to the 103rd Guards Airborne Division, was under command of the 40th Army and consisted of the 108th and 5th Guards Motor Rifle Divisions, the 860th Separate Motor Rifle Regiment, the 56th Separate Airborne Assault Brigade, and the 36th Mixed Air Corps. Later on the 201st and 68th Motor Rifle Divisions also entered the country, along with other smaller units. In all, the initial Soviet force was around 1,800 tanks, 80,000 soldiers and 2,000 AFVs. In the second week alone, Soviet aircraft had made a total of 4,000 flights into Kabul. With the arrival of the two later divisions, the total Soviet force rose to over 100,000 personnel.

International positions on Soviet intervention 
The invasion of a practically defenseless country was shocking for the international community, and caused a sense of alarm for its neighbor Pakistan. Foreign ministers from 34 Muslim-majority countries adopted a resolution which condemned the Soviet intervention and demanded "the immediate, urgent and unconditional withdrawal of Soviet troops" from the Muslim nation of Afghanistan. The UN General Assembly passed a resolution protesting the Soviet intervention in Afghanistan by a vote of 104–18. According to political scientist Gilles Kepel, the Soviet intervention or "invasion" was "viewed with horror" in the West, considered to be a "fresh twist" on the geo-political "Great Game" of the 19th century in which Britain feared that Russia sought access to the Indian Ocean, and posed "a threat to Western security", explicitly violating "the world balance of power agreed upon at Yalta" in 1945.

The general feeling in the United States was that inaction against the Soviet Union could encourage Moscow to go further in its international ambitions. President Jimmy Carter placed a trade embargo against the Soviet Union on shipments of commodities such as grain, while also leading a boycott of the 1980 Summer Olympics in Moscow. The intervention, along with other concurrent events such as the Iranian Revolution and the hostage stand-off that accompanied it showed the volatility of the wider region for U.S. foreign policy.

Carter also withdrew the SALT-II treaty from consideration before the Senate, recalled the US Ambassador Thomas J. Watson from Moscow, and suspended high-technology exports to the Soviet Union.

China condemned the Soviet coup and its military buildup, calling it a threat to Chinese security (both the Soviet Union and Afghanistan shared borders with China), that it marked the worst escalation of Soviet expansionism in over a decade, and that it was a warning to other Third World leaders with close relations to the Soviet Union. Vice Premier Deng Xiaoping warmly praised the "heroic resistance" of the Afghan people. Beijing also stated that the lacklustre worldwide reaction against Vietnam (in the Sino-Vietnamese War earlier in 1979) encouraged the Soviets to feel free invading Afghanistan.

The Warsaw Pact countries (excluding Romania) publicly supported the intervention; however a press account in June 1980 showed that Poland, Hungary and Romania privately informed the Soviet Union that the invasion was a damaging mistake.

Military aid
Weapons supplies were made available through numerous countries. Before the Soviet intervention, the insurgents received support from the United States, Pakistan, Saudi Arabia, Egypt, Libya and Kuwait, albeit on a limited scale. After the intervention, aid was substantially increased. The United States purchased all of Israel's captured Soviet weapons clandestinely, and then funnelled the weapons to the Mujahideen, while Egypt upgraded its army's weapons and sent the older weapons to the militants. Turkey sold their World War II stockpiles to the warlords, and the British and Swiss provided Blowpipe missiles and Oerlikon anti-aircraft guns respectively, after they were found to be poor models for their own forces. China provided the most relevant weapons, likely due to their own experience with guerrilla warfare, and kept meticulous record of all the shipments. The US, Saudi and Chinese aid combined totaled between $6 billion and $12 billion.

State of the Cold War
In the wider Cold War, drastic changes were taking place in Southwestern Asia concurrent with the 1978–1979 upheavals in Afghanistan that changed the nature of the two superpowers. In February 1979, the Iranian Revolution ousted the American-backed Shah from Iran, losing the United States as one of its most powerful allies. The United States then deployed twenty ships in the Persian Gulf and the Arabian Sea including two aircraft carriers, and there were constant threats of war between the U.S. and Iran.

American observers argued that the global balance of power had shifted to the Soviet Union following the emergence of several pro-Soviet regimes in the Third World in the latter half of the 1970s (such as in Nicaragua and Ethiopia), and the action in Afghanistan demonstrated the Soviet Union's expansionism.

March 1979 marked the signing of the U.S.-backed peace agreement between Israel and Egypt. The Soviet leadership saw the agreement as giving a major advantage to the United States. A Soviet newspaper stated that Egypt and Israel were now "gendarmes of the Pentagon". The Soviets viewed the treaty not only as a peace agreement between their erstwhile allies in Egypt and the US-supported Israelis but also as a military pact. In addition, the US sold more than 5,000 missiles to Saudi Arabia, and Soviet Union's previously strong relations with Iraq had recently soured, as in June 1978 it began entering into friendlier relations with the Western world and buying French and Italian-made weapons, though the vast majority still came from the Soviet Union, its Warsaw Pact allies, and China.

The Soviet intervention has also been analyzed with the model of the resource curse. The 1979 Islamic Revolution in Iran saw a massive increase in the scarcity and price of oil, adding tens of billions of dollars to the Soviet economy. The oil boom may have overinflated national confidence, serving as a catalyst for the invasion. The Politburo was temporarily relieved of financial constraints and sought to fulfill a long-term geopolitical goal of seizing the lead in the region between Central Asia and the Gulf.

December 1979 – February 1980: Occupation and national unrest 
The first phase of the war began with the Soviet intervention in Afghanistan and first battles with various opposition groups. Soviet troops entered Afghanistan along two ground routes and one air corridor, quickly taking control of the major urban centers, military bases and strategic installations. However, the presence of Soviet troops did not have the desired effect of pacifying the country. On the contrary, it exacerbated nationalistic sentiment, causing the rebellion to spread further. Babrak Karmal, Afghanistan's new leadership, charged the Soviets with causing an increase in the unrest, and demanded that the 40th Army step in and quell the rebellion, as his own army had proved untrustworthy. Thus, Soviet troops found themselves drawn into fighting against urban uprisings, tribal armies (called lashkar), and sometimes against mutinying Afghan Army units. These forces mostly fought in the open, and Soviet airpower and artillery made short work of them.

The Soviet occupation provoked a great deal of fear and unrest amongst a wide spectrum of the Afghan populace. The Soviets held the view that their presence would be accepted after having rid Afghanistan of the "tyrannical" Khalq regime, but this was not to be. In the first week of January 1980, attacks against Soviet soldiers in Kabul became common, with roaming soldiers often assassinated in the city in broad daylight by civilians. In the summer of that year, numerous members of the ruling party would be assassinated in individual attacks. The Soviet Army quit patrolling Kabul in January 1981 after their losses due to terrorism, handing the responsibility over to the Afghan army. Tensions in Kabul peaked during the 3 Hoot uprising on 22 February 1980, when the Soviet soldiers stopped acting in self-defense. The city uprising took a dangerous turn once again during the student demonstrations of April and May 1980, in which scores of students were killed by soldiers and PDPA sympathizers.

The opposition to the Soviet presence was great nationally, crossing regional, ethnic, and linguistic lines. Never before in Afghan history had this many people been united in opposition against an invading foreign power. In Kandahar a few days after the invasion, civilians rose up against Soviet soldiers, killing a number of them, causing the soldiers to withdraw to their garrison. In this city, 130 Khalqists were murdered between January and February 1980.

According to the Mitrokhin Archive, the Soviet Union deployed numerous active measures at the beginning of the intervention, spreading disinformation relating to both diplomatic status and military intelligence. These efforts focused on most countries bordering Afghanistan, on several international powers, the Soviet's main adversary, the United States, and neutral countries. The disinformation was deployed primarily by "leaking" forged documents, distributing leaflets, publishing nominally independent articles in Soviet-aligned press, and conveying reports to embassies through KGB residencies. Among the active measures pursued in 1980–1982 were both pro- and anti-separatist documents disseminated in Pakistan, a forged letter implying a Pakistani-Iranian alliance, alleged reports of U.S. bases on the Iranian border, information regarding Pakistan's military intentions filtered through the Pakistan embassy in Bangkok to the Carter Administration, and various disinformation about armed interference by India, Sri Lanka, Bangladesh, Nepal, Indonesia, Jordan, Italy, and France, among others.

Operations against the guerrillas, 1980–1985 

The war now developed into a new pattern: the Soviets occupied the cities and main axis of communication, while the Afghan mujahideen, which the Soviet Army soldiers called 'Dushman,' meaning 'enemy', divided into small groups and waged a guerrilla war in the mountains. Almost 80 percent of the country was outside government control. Soviet troops were deployed in strategic areas in the northeast, especially along the road from Termez to Kabul. In the west, a strong Soviet presence was maintained to counter Iranian influence. Incidentally, special Soviet units would have also performed secret attacks on Iranian territory to destroy suspected Mujahideen bases, and their helicopters then got engaged in shootings with Iranian jets. Conversely, some regions such as Nuristan, in the northeast, and Hazarajat, in the central mountains of Afghanistan, were virtually untouched by the fighting, and lived in almost complete independence.

Periodically the Soviet Army undertook multi-divisional offensives into Mujahideen-controlled areas. Between 1980 and 1985, nine offensives were launched into the strategically important Panjshir Valley, but government control in the area did not improve. Heavy fighting also occurred in the provinces neighbouring Pakistan, where cities and government outposts were constantly besieged by the Mujahideen. Massive Soviet operations would regularly break these sieges, but the Mujahideen would return as soon as the Soviets left. In the west and south, fighting was more sporadic, except in the cities of Herat and Kandahar, which were always partly controlled by the resistance.

The Soviets did not initially foresee taking on such an active role in fighting the rebels and attempted to play down their role there as giving light assistance to the Afghan army. However, the arrival of the Soviets had the opposite effect as it incensed instead of pacified the people, causing the Mujahideen to gain in strength and numbers. Originally the Soviets thought that their forces would strengthen the backbone of the Afghan army and provide assistance by securing major cities, lines of communication and transportation. The Afghan army forces had a high desertion rate and were loath to fight, especially since the Soviet forces pushed them into infantry roles while they manned the armored vehicles and artillery. The main reason that the Afghan soldiers were so ineffective, though, was their lack of morale, as many of them were not truly loyal to the communist government but simply wanting a paycheck.

Once it became apparent that the Soviets would have to get their hands dirty, they followed three main strategies aimed at quelling the uprising. Intimidation was the first strategy, in which the Soviets would use airborne attacks and armored ground attacks to destroy villages, livestock and crops in trouble areas. The Soviets would bomb villages that were near sites of guerrilla attacks on Soviet convoys or known to support resistance groups. Local peoples were forced to either flee their homes or die as daily Soviet attacks made it impossible to live in these areas. By forcing the people of Afghanistan to flee their homes, the Soviets hoped to deprive the guerrillas of resources and safe havens. The second strategy consisted of subversion, which entailed sending spies to join resistance groups and report information, as well as bribing local tribes or guerrilla leaders into ceasing operations. Finally, the Soviets used military forays into contested territories in an effort to root out the guerrillas and limit their options. Classic search and destroy operations were implemented using Mil Mi-24 helicopter gunships that would provide cover for ground forces in armored vehicles. Once the villages were occupied by Soviet forces, inhabitants who remained were frequently interrogated and tortured for information or killed.

To complement their brute force approach to weeding out the insurgency, the Soviets used KHAD (Afghan secret police) to gather intelligence, infiltrate the Mujahideen, spread false information, bribe tribal militias into fighting and organize a government militia. While it is impossible to know exactly how successful the KHAD was in infiltrating Mujahideen groups, it is thought that they succeeded in penetrating a good many resistance groups based in Afghanistan, Pakistan and Iran. KHAD is thought to have had particular success in igniting internal rivalries and political divisions amongst the resistance groups, rendering some of them completely useless because of infighting. The KHAD had some success in securing tribal loyalties but many of these relationships were fickle and temporary. Often KHAD secured neutrality agreements rather than committed political alignment. The Sarandoy, a KHAD-controlled government militia, had mixed success in the war. Large salaries and proper weapons attracted a good number of recruits to the cause, even if they were not necessarily "pro-communist". The problem was that many of the recruits they attracted were in fact Mujahideen who would join up to procure arms, ammunition and money while also gathering information about forthcoming military operations.

In 1985, the size of the LCOSF (Limited Contingent of Soviet Forces) was increased to 108,800 and fighting increased throughout the country, making 1985 the bloodiest year of the war. However, despite suffering heavily, the Mujahideen were able to remain in the field, mostly because they received thousands of new volunteers daily, and continued resisting the Soviets.

Reforms of the Karmal administration 
Babrak Karmal, after the invasion, promised reforms to win support from the population alienated by his ousted predecessors. A temporary constitution, the Fundamental Principles of the Democratic Republic of Afghanistan, was adopted in April 1980. On paper, it was a democratic constitution including "right of free expression" and disallowing "torture, persecution, and punishment, contrary to human dignity". Karmal's government was formed of his fellow Parchamites along with (pro-Taraki) Khalqists, and a number of known non-communists/leftists in various ministries.

Karmal called his regime “a new evolutionary phase of the glorious April Revolution,” but he failed at uniting the PDPA. In the eyes of many Afghans, he was still seen as a "puppet" of the Soviet Union.

Mujahideen insurrection 

In the mid-1980s, the Afghan resistance movement, assisted by the United States, Pakistan, Saudi Arabia, the United Kingdom, Egypt, the People's Republic of China and others, contributed to Moscow's high military costs and strained international relations. The U.S. viewed the conflict in Afghanistan as an integral Cold War struggle, and the CIA provided assistance to anti-Soviet forces through the Pakistani intelligence services, in a program called Operation Cyclone.

Pakistan's North-West Frontier Province became a base for the Afghan resistance fighters and the Deobandi ulama of that province played a significant role in the Afghan 'jihad', with Darul Uloom Haqqania becoming a prominent organisational and networking base for the anti-Soviet Afghan fighters. As well as money, Muslim countries provided thousands of volunteer fighters known as "Afghan Arabs", who wished to wage jihad against the atheist communists. Notable among them was a young Saudi named Osama bin Laden, whose Arab group eventually evolved into al-Qaeda. Despite their numbers, the contribution has been called a "curious sideshow to the real fighting," with only an estimated 2000 of them fighting "at any one time", compared with about 250,000 Afghan fighters and 125,000 Soviet troops. Their efforts were also sometimes counterproductive, as in the March 1989 battle for Jalalabad. Instead of being the beginning of the collapse of the Afghan Communist government forces after their abandonment by the Soviets, the Afghan communists rallied to break the siege of Jalalabad and to win the first major government victory in years, provoked by the sight of a truck filled with dismembered bodies of Communists chopped to pieces after surrendering by radical non-Afghan salafists eager to show the enemy the fate awaiting the infidels. "This success reversed the government's demoralization from the withdrawal of Soviet forces, renewed its determination to fight on, and allowed it to survive three more years."

Maoist guerrilla groups were also active, to a lesser extent compared to the religious Mujahideen. Perhaps the most notable of these groups was the Liberation Organization of the People of Afghanistan (SAMA), which launched skilled guerrilla attacks and controlled some territory north of Kabul in the early years of the war. The Maoist resistance eventually lost its pace and was severely weakened following the deaths of leaders Faiz Ahmad and Mulavi Dawood in 1986, both committed by the Hezb-e Islami Gulbuddin Mujahideen faction.

Afghanistan's resistance movement was born in chaos, spread and triumphed chaotically, and did not find a way to govern differently. Virtually all of its war was waged locally by regional warlords. As warfare became more sophisticated, outside support and regional coordination grew. Even so, the basic units of Mujahideen organization and action continued to reflect the highly segmented nature of Afghan society.

Olivier Roy estimates that after four years of war, there were at least 4,000 bases from which Mujahideen units operated. Most of these were affiliated with the seven expatriate parties headquartered in Pakistan, which served as sources of supply and varying degrees of supervision. Significant commanders typically led 300 or more men, controlled several bases and dominated a district or a sub-division of a province. Hierarchies of organization above the bases were attempted. Their operations varied greatly in scope, the most ambitious being achieved by Ahmad Shah Massoud of the Panjshir valley north of Kabul. He led at least 10,000 trained troopers at the end of the Soviet war and had expanded his political control of Tajik-dominated areas to Afghanistan's northeastern provinces under the Supervisory Council of the North.

Roy also describes regional, ethnic and sectarian variations in Mujahideen organization. In the Pashtun areas of the east, south and southwest, tribal structure, with its many rival sub-divisions, provided the basis for military organization and leadership. Mobilization could be readily linked to traditional fighting allegiances of the tribal lashkar (fighting force). In favorable circumstances such formations could quickly reach more than 10,000, as happened when large Soviet assaults were launched in the eastern provinces, or when the Mujahideen besieged towns, such as Khost in Paktia province in July 1983. But in campaigns of the latter type the traditional explosions of manpower—customarily common immediately after the completion of harvest—proved obsolete when confronted by well dug-in defenders with modern weapons. Lashkar durability was notoriously short; few sieges succeeded.

Mujahideen mobilization in non-Pashtun regions faced very different obstacles. Prior to the intervention, few non-Pashtuns possessed firearms. Early in the war they were most readily available from army troops or gendarmerie who defected or were ambushed. The international arms market and foreign military support tended to reach the minority areas last. In the northern regions, little military tradition had survived upon which to build an armed resistance. Mobilization mostly came from political leadership closely tied to Islam. Roy contrasts the social leadership of religious figures in the Persian- and Turkic-speaking regions of Afghanistan with that of the Pashtuns. Lacking a strong political representation in a state dominated by Pashtuns, minority communities commonly looked to pious learned or charismatically revered pirs (saints) for leadership. Extensive Sufi and maraboutic networks were spread through the minority communities, readily available as foundations for leadership, organization, communication and indoctrination. These networks also provided for political mobilization, which led to some of the most effective of the resistance operations during the war.

The Mujahideen favoured sabotage operations. The more common types of sabotage included damaging power lines, knocking out pipelines and radio stations, blowing up government office buildings, air terminals, hotels, cinemas, and so on. In the border region with Pakistan, the Mujahideen would often launch 800 rockets per day. Between April 1985 and January 1987, they carried out over 23,500 shelling attacks on government targets. The Mujahideen surveyed firing positions that they normally located near villages within the range of Soviet artillery posts, putting the villagers in danger of death from Soviet retaliation. The Mujahideen used land mines heavily. Often, they would enlist the services of the local inhabitants, even children.

They concentrated on both civilian and military targets, knocking out bridges, closing major roads, attacking convoys, disrupting the electric power system and industrial production, and attacking police stations and Soviet military installations and air bases. They assassinated government officials and PDPA members, and laid siege to small rural outposts. In March 1982, a bomb exploded at the Ministry of Education, damaging several buildings. In the same month, a widespread power failure darkened Kabul when a pylon on the transmission line from the Naghlu power station was blown up. In June 1982 a column of about 1,000 young communist party members sent out to work in the Panjshir valley were ambushed within 30 km of Kabul, with heavy loss of life. On 4 September 1985, insurgents shot down a domestic Bakhtar Airlines plane as it took off from Kandahar airport, killing all 52 people aboard.

Mujahideen groups used for assassination had three to five men in each. After they received their mission to kill certain government officials, they busied themselves with studying his pattern of life and its details and then selecting the method of fulfilling their established mission. They practiced shooting at automobiles, shooting out of automobiles, laying mines in government accommodation or houses, using poison, and rigging explosive charges in transport.

In May 1985, the seven principal rebel organizations formed the Seven Party Mujahideen Alliance to coordinate their military operations against the Soviet Army. Late in 1985, the groups were active in and around Kabul, unleashing rocket attacks and conducting operations against the communist government.

Raids inside Soviet territory 
In an effort to foment unrest and rebellion by the Islamic populations of the Soviet Union, starting in late 1984 Director of CIA William Casey encouraged Mujahideen militants to mount violent sabotage raids inside the Soviet Union, according to Robert Gates, Casey's executive assistant and Mohammed Yousef, the Pakistani ISI brigadier general who was the chief for Afghan operations. The rebels began cross-border raids into the Soviet Union in Spring 1985. In April 1987, three separate teams of Afghan rebels were directed by the ISI to launch coordinated violent raids on multiple targets across the Soviet border and extending, in the case of an attack on an Uzbek factory, as deep as over  into Soviet territory. In response, the Soviets issued a thinly-veiled threat to invade Pakistan to stop the cross-border attacks: No further attacks were reported.

Media reaction 

International journalistic perception of the war varied. Major American television journalists were sympathetic to the Mujahideen. Most visible was CBS News correspondent Dan Rather, who in 1982 accused the Soviets of "genocide", comparing them to Hitler. Rather was embedded with the Mujahideen for a 60 Minutes report. In 1987, CBS produced a full documentary special on the war. A retrospective commentary for Niemen Reports criticized mainstream television for biased presentation of a "Ramboesque struggle of holy warriors against the evil empire."

Reader's Digest took a highly positive view of the Mujahideen, a reversal of their usual view of Islamic fighters. The publication praised their martyrdom and their role in entrapping the Soviets in a Vietnam War-style disaster.

At least some, such as leftist journalist Alexander Cockburn, were unsympathetic, criticizing Afghanistan as "an unspeakable country filled with unspeakable people, sheepshaggers and smugglers, who have furnished in their leisure hours some of the worst arts and crafts ever to penetrate the occidental world. I yield to none in my sympathy to those prostrate beneath the Russian jackboot, but if ever a country deserved rape it's Afghanistan." Robert D. Kaplan on the other hand, thought any perception of Mujahideen as "barbaric" was unfair: "Documented accounts of mujahidin savagery were relatively rare and involved enemy troops only. Their cruelty toward civilians was unheard of during the war, while Soviet cruelty toward civilians was common." Lack of interest in the Mujahideen cause, Kaplan believed, was not the lack of intrinsic interest to be found in a war between a small, poor country and a superpower where a million civilians were killed, but the result of the great difficulty and unprofitability of media coverage. Kaplan noted that "none of the American TV networks had a bureau for a war", and television cameramen venturing to follow the Mujahideen "trekked for weeks on little food, only to return ill and half starved". In October 1984 the Soviet ambassador to Pakistan, Vitaly Smirnov, told Agence France Presse "that journalists traveling with the mujahidin 'will be killed. And our units in Afghanistan will help the Afghan forces to do it. Unlike Vietnam and Lebanon, Afghanistan had "absolutely no clash between the strange and the familiar", no "rock-video quality" of "zonked-out GIs in headbands" or "rifle-wielding Shiite terrorists wearing Michael Jackson T-shirts" that provided interesting "visual materials" for newscasts.

Soviet exit and change of Afghan leadership, 1985–1989

Foreign diplomatic efforts 
As early as 1983, Pakistan's Foreign Ministry began working with the Soviet Union to provide them an exit from Afghanistan, initiatives led by Foreign Minister Yaqub Ali Khan and Khurshid Kasuri. Despite an active support for insurgent groups, Pakistanis remained sympathetic to the challenges faced by the Soviets in restoring the peace, eventually exploring the possibility of setting up an interim system of government under former monarch Zahir Shah, but this was not authorized by President Zia-ul-Haq due to his stance on the issue of the Durand line. In 1984–85, Foreign Minister Yaqub Ali Khan paid state visits to China, Saudi Arabia, Soviet Union, France, United States and the United Kingdom in order to develop a framework. On 20 July 1987, the withdrawal of Soviet troops from the country was announced. The withdrawal of Soviet forces was planned out by Col. General Boris Gromov, who, at the time, was the commander of the 40th Army.

April 1985 – January 1987: Exit strategy 

The first step of the Soviet Union's exit strategy was to transfer the burden of fighting the Mujahideen to the Afghan armed forces, with the aim of preparing them to operate without Soviet help. During this phase, the Soviet contingent was restricted to supporting the DRA forces by providing artillery, air support and technical assistance, though some large-scale operations were still carried out by Soviet troops.

Under Soviet guidance, the DRA armed forces were built up to an official strength of 302,000 in 1986. To minimize the risk of a coup d'état, they were divided into different branches, each modeled on its Soviet counterpart. The ministry of defence forces numbered 132,000, the ministry of interior 70,000 and the ministry of state security (KHAD) 80,000. However, these were theoretical figures: in reality each service was plagued with desertions, the army alone suffering 32,000 per year.

The decision to engage primarily Afghan forces was taken by the Soviets, but was resented by the PDPA, who viewed the departure of their protectors without enthusiasm. In May 1987 a DRA force attacked well-entrenched Mujahideen positions in the Arghandab District, but the Mujahideen managed to hold their ground, and the attackers suffered heavy casualties. In the spring of 1986, an offensive into the Paktia Province briefly occupied the Mujahideen base at Zhawar at the cost of heavy losses. Meanwhile, the Mujahideen benefited from expanded foreign military support from the United States, United Kingdom, Saudi Arabia, Pakistan, and other Muslim-majority countries. Two Heritage Foundation foreign policy analysts, Michael Johns and James A. Phillips, championed Ahmed Shah Massoud as the Afghan resistance leader most worthy of US support under the Reagan Doctrine.

May 1986–1988: Najibullah and his reforms 
The government of President Karmal, a puppet regime, was largely ineffective. It was weakened by divisions within the PDPA and the Parcham faction, and the regime's efforts to expand its base of support proved futile. Moscow came to regard Karmal as a failure and blamed him for the problems. Years later, when Karmal's inability to consolidate his government had become obvious, Mikhail Gorbachev, then General Secretary of the Soviet Communist Party, said, "The main reason that there has been no national consolidation so far is that Comrade Karmal is hoping to continue sitting in Kabul with our help." Karmal's consoliation plan only involved those who had not raised arms against the regime, and even demanded Soviet troops to seal the border with Pakistan before any negotiations with Mujahideen. Eventually, the Soviet Union decided to dispose of Karmal from the leadership of Afghanistan.

In May 1986, Mohammed Najibullah, former chief of the Afghan secret police (KHAD), was elected General Secretary and later as President of the Revolutionary Council. The relatively young new leader wasn't known that well to the Afghan population at the time, but he made swift reforms to change the country's situation and win support as devised by experts of the Communist Party of the Soviet Union. An eloquent speaker in both the Pashto and Dari languages, Najibullah engaged with elders and presented both himself and the state as Islamic, sometimes backing his speeches with excerpts from the Qur'an. A number of prisoners were released, while the night curfew in Kabul that had been in place since 1980 was finally lifted. He also moved against pro-Karmal Parchamites, who were expelled from the Revolutionary Council and the Politburo.

President Najibullah launched the "National Reconciliation" program at the start of 1987, the goal of which was to unite the nation and end the war that had enveloped the nation for seven years. He expressed willingness to negotiate with the Mujahideen resistance, allow parties other than the PDPA to be active, and indicated that exiled King Zahir Shah could be part of the process. A six month ceasefire also began in December 1986. His administration was also more open to foreign visitors outside the Soviet bloc. In November 1987, Najibullah convened a loya jirga selected by the authorities which successfully passed a new constitution for Afghanistan, creating a presidential system with an elective bicameral parliament. The constitution declared “the sacred religion of Islam” the official religion, guaranteed the democratic rights of the individual, made it legal to form “political parties”, and promoted equality between the various tribes and nationalities. Despite high expectations, the new policy only had limited impact in regaining support from the population and the resistance, partly because of the high distrust and unpopularity of the PDPA and KHAD, as well as Najibullah's loyalty to Moscow.

As part of the new structure, national parliamentary elections were held in 1988 to elect members of the new National Assembly, the first such elections in Afghanistan in 19 years.

Negotiations for a coalition 
Ex-king Zahir Shah remained a popular figure to most Afghans. Diego Cordovez of the UN also recognized the king as a potential key to a political settlement to the war after the Soviet troops would leave. Polls in 1987 showed that he was a favored figure to lead a potential coalition between the DRA regime and Mujahideen factions, as well as an opposition to the unpopular but powerful guerrilla leader Gulbuddin Hekmatyar, who was strongly against the King's return. Pakistan however was against this and refused to grant the ex-king a visa for potential negotiations with Mujahideen. Pakistan's President Zia ul-Haq and his supporters in the military were determined to put a conservative Islamic ally in power in Kabul.

April 1988: The Geneva Accords 

Following lengthy negotiations, the Geneva Accords was signed in 1988 between Afghanistan and Pakistan. Supported by the Soviet Union and the United States respectively, the two Asian countries agreed to refrain from any form of interference in each other’s territory. They also agreed to give Afghan refugees in Pakistan to voluntarily return. The two superpowers agreed to halt their interference in Afghanistan, which included a Soviet withdrawal.

The United Nations set up a special mission to oversee the process. In this way, President Najibullah had stabilized his political position enough to begin matching Moscow's moves toward withdrawal. Among other things the Geneva Accords identified the US and Soviet non-intervention in the internal affairs of Pakistan and Afghanistan and a timetable for full Soviet withdrawal. The agreement on withdrawal held, and on 15 February 1989, the last Soviet troops departed on schedule from Afghanistan.

January 1987 – February 1989: Withdrawal 

The promotion of Mikhail Gorbachev to General Secretary in 1985 and his 'new thinking' on foreign and domestic policy was likely an important factor in the Soviets' decision to withdraw. Gorbachev had been attempting to remove the Soviet Union from the economic stagnation that had set in under the leadership of Brezhnev, and to reform the Soviet Union's economy and image with the Glasnost and Perestroika policies. Gorbachev had also been attempting to ease cold war tensions by signing the Intermediate-Range Nuclear Forces Treaty with the U.S. in 1987 and withdrawing the troops from Afghanistan, whose presence had garnered so much international condemnation. Gorbachev regarded confrontation with China and resulting military build ups on that border as one of Brezhnev's biggest mistakes. Beijing had stipulated that a normalization of relations would have to wait until Moscow withdrew its army from Afghanistan (among other things), and in 1989 the first Sino-Soviet summit in 30 years took place. At the same time, Gorbachev pressured his Cuban allies in Angola to scale down activities and withdraw even though Soviet allies were faring somewhat better there. The Soviets also pulled many of their troops out of Mongolia in 1987, where they were also having a far easier time than in Afghanistan, and restrained the Vietnamese invasion of Kampuchea to the point of an all-out withdrawal in 1988. This massive withdrawal of Soviet forces from such highly contested areas shows that the Soviet government's decision to leave Afghanistan was based upon a general change in Soviet foreign policy – from one of confrontation to avoidance of conflict wherever possible.

In the last phase, Soviet troops prepared and executed their withdrawal from Afghanistan, whilst limiting the launching of offensive operations by those who had not withdrawn yet.

By mid-1987 the Soviet Union announced that it would start withdrawing its forces. Sibghatullah Mojaddedi was selected as the head of the Interim Islamic State of Afghanistan, in an attempt to reassert its legitimacy against the Moscow-sponsored Kabul regime. Mojaddedi, as head of the Interim Afghan Government, met with then-Vice President of the United States George H. W. Bush, achieving a critical diplomatic victory for the Afghan resistance. Defeat of the Kabul government was their solution for peace. This confidence, sharpened by their distrust of the United Nations, virtually guaranteed their refusal to accept a political compromise.

In September 1988, Soviet MiG-23 fighters shot down two Iranian AH-1J Cobra helicopters which had intruded into Afghan airspace.

Operation Magistral was one of the final offensive operations undertaken by the Soviets, a successful sweep operation that cleared the road between the towns of Gardez and Khost. This operation did not have any lasting effect on the outcome of the conflict nor on the soiled political and military status of the Soviets in the eyes of the West, but was a symbolic gesture that marked the end of their widely condemned presence in the country with a victory.

The first half of the Soviet contingent was withdrawn from 15 May to 16 August 1988, and the second from 15 November to 15 February 1989. In order to ensure a safe passage, the Soviets had negotiated ceasefires with local Mujahideen commanders. The withdrawal was generally executed peacefully except for the operation "Typhoon".

General Yazov, the Defense Minister of Soviet Union, ordered the 40th Army to violate the agreement with Ahmed Shah Masood, who commanded a large force in the Panjshir Valley, and attack his relaxed and exposed forces. The Soviet attack was initiated to protect Najibullah, who did not have a ceasefire in effect with Masood, and who rightly feared an offensive by Masood's forces after the Soviet withdrawal. General Gromov, the 40th Army Commander, objected to the operation, but reluctantly obeyed the order. "Typhoon" began on 23 January and continued for three days. To minimize their own losses, the Soviets abstained from close-range fight. Instead, they used long-range artillery, surface-to-surface and air-to-surface missiles. Numerous civilian casualties were reported. Masood had not threatened the withdrawal to this point, and did not attack Soviet forces after they breached the agreement. Overall, the Soviet attack represented a defeat for Masood's forces, who lost 600 fighters killed and wounded.

After the withdrawal of the Soviets, the DRA forces were left fighting alone and had to abandon some provincial capitals, and it was widely believed that they would not be able to resist the Mujahideen for long. However, in the spring of 1989 DRA forces inflicted a major defeat on the Mujahideen at Jalalabad. The United States, having achieved its goal of forcing the Soviet Union's withdrawal from Afghanistan, gradually disengaged itself from the country.

Causes of withdrawal 
Some of the causes of the Soviet Union's withdrawal from Afghanistan leading to the Afghanistan regime's eventual defeat include
 The Soviet Army of 1980 was trained and equipped for large scale, conventional warfare in Central Europe against a similar opponent, i.e. it used armored and motor-rifle formations. This was notably ineffective against small scale guerrilla groups using hit-and-run tactics in the rough terrain of Afghanistan. Also, the Soviet Army's large formations were not mobile enough to engage small groups of Mujahideen fighters that easily merged back into the terrain. The set strategy also meant that troops were discouraged from "tactical initiative", essential in counter insurgency, because it "tended to upset operational timing".
 The Soviets used large-scale offensives against Mujahideen strongholds, such as in the Panjshir Valley, which temporarily cleared those sectors and killed many civilians in addition to enemy combatants. The biggest shortcoming here, though, was the fact that once the Soviets engaged the enemy with force, they failed to hold the ground, as they withdrew once their operation was completed. The killing of civilians further alienated the population from the Soviets, with bad long-term effects.
 The Soviets did not have enough men to fight a counter-insurgency war (COIN), and their troops had low morale. The peak number of Soviet troops during the war was 115,000, but the bulk of these troops were conscripts, which led to poor combat performance in their Motor-Rifle Formations. However, the Soviets did have their elite infantry units, such as the famed Spetsnaz, the VDV, and their recon infantry. The problem with their elite units was not combat effectiveness, but that there were not enough of them and that they were employed incorrectly.
 Intelligence gathering, essential for successful COIN, was inadequate. The Soviets overly relied on less-than-accurate aerial recon and radio intercepts rather than their recon infantry and special forces. Although their special forces and recon infantry units performed very well in combat against the Mujahideen, they would have better served in intelligence gathering.
 The concept of a "war of national liberation" against a Soviet-sponsored "revolutionary" regime was so alien to the Soviet dogma that the leadership could not "come to grips" with it. This led to, among other things, a suppression by the Soviet media for several years of the truth about how bad the war was going, which caused a backlash when it was unable to hide it further.

Fall of Najibullah government, 1992 
After the withdrawal of Soviet troops in 1989, the government of Mohammad Najibullah remained in power until April 15, 1992. Najibullah stepped down that day as Mujahideen guerrilla forces moved into Kabul. He attempted to fly to India under the protection of the U.N., but was blocked from leaving at the airport. He then took refuge at a United Nations compound in Kabul. After a bloody, four-year power struggle between different factions of the victorious anti-Najibullah forces, the Taliban took Kabul. They stormed the U.N. compound on September 26, 1996. They eventually tortured and killed Najibullah.

Aerial engagements

Afghan and Soviet warplanes in Pakistani airspace 
Soviet Union and Democratic Republic of Afghanistan Air Force jet fighters and bombers would occasionally cross into Pakistani airspace to target Afghan refugees camps in Pakistan. To counter the Soviet jets, the United States started providing F-16 jets to Pakistan. These F-16 jets lacked the capability to fire radar-guided beyond-visual range missiles, and thus they were required to get close to their opponents in order to use their AIM-9P and more advanced AIM-9L Sidewinder heat-seeking or their 20-millimeter Vulcan cannons. On 17 May 1986, two Pakistan Air Force (PAF) F-16 jets intercepted two Su-22M3K belonging to Democratic Republic of Afghanistan Air Force (DRAAF) near the Pakistani airspace. Pakistani officials insisted that both the fighter jets belonging to DRAAF were shot down while Afghan officials confirmed loss of only one fighter jet. Following the engagement, there was a major decline in the number of attacks on Afghan refugees camps in Pakistan. On 16 April 1987, a group of PAF F-16s again chased down two DRAAF Su-22 and managed to shoot down one of them and capture its pilot. In 1987, the Soviet Union reported that Pakistani fighter jets were roaming in Afghan airspace, harassing attempts to aerial resupply the besieged garrisons like the one in Khost. On 30 March 1987, two PAF F-16s shot down an An-26 cargo plane, killing all 39 personnel on board the aircraft. In the coming years, PAF claimed credit for shooting down several Mi-8 transport helicopters, and another An-26 which was on a reconnaissance mission in 1989. Also in 1987, two PAF F-16 jets ambushed four Mig-23 which were bombing Mujahideen supply bases. In the clash, one PAF F-16 was lost after it was accidentally hit by an AIM-9 Sidewinder fired by the second PAF F-16. The PAF pilot landed in Afghanistan territory and was smuggled back to Pakistan along with wreckage of his aircraft by the Mujahideen. However, some Russian sources claim that the F-16 was shot down by a Mig-23, though the Soviet Mig-23 were not carrying air-to-air missiles.

On 8 August 1988, Colonel Alexander Rutskoy was leading a group of Sukhoi Su-25 fighter jets to attack a refugee camp in Miramshah, Pakistan. His fighter jet was intercepted and shot down by two PAF F-16. Colonel Alexander Rustkoy landed in Pakistani territory and was captured. He was later exchanged back to the Soviet Union. A month later, around twelve Mig-23 crossed into Pakistani airspace with the aim to lure into ambush the Pakistani F-16s. Two PAF F-16s flew towards the Soviet fighter jets. The Soviet radars failed to detect the low flying F-16s, and the Sidewinder fired by one of the F-16s damaged one of the Mig-23. However, the damaged Mig-23 managed to return home. Two Mig-23 engaged the two PAF F-16s. The Pakistani officials state that both the Mig-23 were shot down. However, Soviet records show that no additional aircraft were lost that day. The last aerial engagement took place on 3 November 1988, in which one Su-2M4K belonging to DRAAF was shot down by a Pakistani Air Force jet.

During the conflict, Pakistan Air Force F-16 had shot down ten aircraft, belonging to Soviet Union, which had intruded into Pakistani territory. However, the Soviet record only confirmed five kills (three Su-22s, one Su-25 and one An-26). Some sources show that PAF had shot down at least a dozen more aircraft during the war. However, those kills were not officially acknowledged because they took place in Afghanistan's airspace and acknowledging those kills would mean that Afghan airspace was violated by PAF. In all, Pakistan Air Force F-16s had downed several MiG-23s, Su-22s, an Su-25, and an An-24 while losing only one F-16.

Stinger missiles and the "Stinger effect" 

Whether the introduction of the personal, portable, infrared-homing surface-to-air "Stinger" missile in September 1986 was a turning point in the war is disputed.
Many Western military analysts credit the Stinger with a kill ratio of about 70% and with responsibility for most of the over 350 Soviet or Afghan government aircraft and helicopters downed in the last two years of the war. Some military analysts considered it a "game changer" and coined the term "Stinger effect" to describe it.
Congressman Charlie Wilson claimed that before the Stinger the Mujahideen never won a set piece battle with the Soviets, but after it was introduced, the Mujahideen never again lost one.

However, these statistics are based on Mujahideen self-reporting, which is of unknown reliability. A Russian general claimed the United States "greatly exaggerated" Soviet and Afghan aircraft losses during the war. According to Soviet figures, in 1987–1988, only 35 aircraft and 63 helicopters were destroyed by all causes. The Pakistan Army fired twenty-eight Stingers at enemy aircraft without a single kill.

Many Russian military analysts tend to be dismissive of the impact of the Stinger. Soviet General Secretary Mikhail Gorbachev decided to withdraw from Afghanistan a year before the Mujahideen fired their first Stinger missiles; Gorbachev was motivated by U.S. sanctions, not military losses. The Stingers did make an impact at first but within a few months flares, beacons, and exhaust baffles were installed to disorient the missiles, while night operation and terrain-hugging tactics tended to prevent the rebels from getting a clear shot. By 1988 the Mujahideen had all but stopped firing them. Stingers also forced Soviet helicopters and ground attack planes to bomb from higher altitudes with less accuracy, but did not bring down many more aircraft than Chinese heavy machine guns and other less sophisticated anti-aircraft weaponry. Gorbachev stated in an interview in 2010 that the Stinger did not influence his decision-making process.

War crimes 

Human Rights Watch concluded that the Soviet Red Army and its communist-allied Afghan Army perpetrated war crimes and crimes against humanity in Afghanistan, intentionally targeting civilians and civilian areas for attack, and killing and torturing prisoners. Several historians and scholars went further, stating that the Afghans were victims of genocide by the Soviet Union. These include American professor Samuel Totten, Australian professor Paul R. Bartrop, scholars from Yale Law School including W. Michael Reisman and Charles Norchi, writer and human rights advocate Rosanne Klass, and scholar Mohammed Kakar.

Helen Fein notes that charges of the U.S. committing genocide during the Vietnam War were repeated by several prominent intellectuals, yet comparatively little attention was paid to the allegations of Soviet genocide against the Afghan people. However, Fein argues that the claims against the Soviets have considerably stronger evidentiary support. Fein states that 9% of the Afghan population perished under Soviet occupation (compared to 3.6% of the 1960 population of Vietnam during the U.S. war and approximately 10% of non-Jewish Poles during the Nazi occupation of Poland) and almost half were displaced, with one-third of Afghans fleeing the country. (By contrast, the sustained refugee flows out of Vietnam occurred after the 1975 defeat of South Vietnam, although millions of Vietnamese were internally displaced by the war.) Furthermore, statements by Soviet soldiers and DRA officials (e.g., "We don't need the people, we need the land!"; "if only 1 million people were left in the country, they would be more than enough to start a new society") and the actual effect of Soviet military actions suggest that depopulation of rural, predominantly Pashtun areas was carried out deliberately in order to deprive the mujahideen of support: 97% of all refugees were from rural areas; Pashtuns decreased from 39% to 22% of the population. The U.S. likely committed war crimes in Vietnam through inconsistent application of its rules of engagement and disproportionate bombardment, but it at least attempted to hold individual soldiers accountable for murder, especially in the case of the only confirmed large-scale massacre committed by U.S. troops (the Mỹ Lai massacre). By contrast, Fein cites two dozen "corroborated" massacres perpetrated by the Soviets in Afghanistan, which went unpunished, adding that in some instances "Soviet defectors have said that there were sanctions against not killing civilians." This policy went beyond collective punishment of villages thought to house mujahideen insurgents—which could itself be a war crime—extending even to the targeting of refugee caravans. Fein concludes that regardless of motive, the Soviets evinced an "intent to destroy the Afghan people" and plausibly violated sections a, b, c, and e of Article II of the 1951 Genocide Convention.

Massacres 

The army of the Soviet Union killed large numbers of Afghans to suppress their resistance. In one notable incident the Soviet Army committed mass killing of civilians in the summer of 1980. To separate the Mujahideen from the local populations and eliminate their support, the Soviet army killed many civilians, drove many more Afghans from their homes, and used scorched-earth tactics to prevent their return. They used booby traps, mines, and chemical substances throughout the country. The Soviet army indiscriminately killed combatants and non-combatants to terrorize local populations into submission. The provinces of Nangarhar, Ghazni, Laghman, Kunar, Zabul, Kandahar, Badakhshan, Logar, Paktia and Paktika witnessed extensive depopulation programmes by the Soviet forces.

Rape 
The Soviet forces abducted Afghan women in helicopters while flying in the country in search of Mujahideen. In November 1980 a number of such incidents had taken place in various parts of the country, including Laghman and Kama. Soviet soldiers as well as KhAD agents kidnapped young women from the city of Kabul and the areas of Darul Aman and Khair Khana, near the Soviet garrisons, to rape them. Women who were taken and raped by Soviet soldiers were considered 'dishonoured' by their families if they returned home. Deserters from the Soviet Army in 1984 also reported the atrocities by Soviet troops on Afghan women and children, including rape.

Wanton destruction 

Irrigation systems, crucial to agriculture in Afghanistan's arid climate, were destroyed by aerial bombing and strafing by Soviet or government forces. In the worst year of the war, 1985, well over half of all the farmers who remained in Afghanistan had their fields bombed, and over one quarter had their irrigation systems destroyed and their livestock shot by Soviet or government troops, according to a survey conducted by Swedish relief experts. Everything was the target in the country, from cities, villages, up to schools, hospitals, roads, bridges, factories and orchards. Soviet tactics included targeting areas which showed support for the Mujahideen, and forcing the populace to flee the rural territories the communists were unable to control. Half of Afghanistan's 24,000 villages were destroyed by the end of the war.

Use of chemical weapons 
There have also been numerous reports of illegal chemical weapons, including mycotoxins, being used by Soviet forces in Afghanistan, often indiscriminately against civilians.

Torture 
Amnesty International concluded that the communist-controlled Afghan government used widespread torture against inmates (officials, teachers, businessmen and students suspected of having ties to the rebels) in interrogation centers in Kabul, run by the KHAD, who were beaten, subjected to electric shocks, burned with cigarettes and that some of their hair was pulled out. Some died from these harsh conditions. Women of the prisoners were forced to watch or were locked up in the cells with the corpses. The Soviets were accused of supervising these tortures.

Looting 
The Soviet soldiers were looting from the dead in Afghanistan, including stealing money, jewelry and clothes. During the Red Army withdrawal in February 1989, 30 to 40 military trucks crammed with Afghan historical treasures crossed into the Soviet Union, under orders from General Boris Gromov. He cut an antique Tekke carpet stolen from Darul Aman Palace into several pieces, and gave it to his acquaintances.

Foreign involvement

Pro-Mujahideen 

The Afghan mujahideen were backed primarily by the United States, Saudi Arabia, Pakistan and the United Kingdom making it a Cold War proxy war. Out of the countries that supported the Mujahideen, the U.S. and Saudi Arabia offered the greatest financial support. However, private donors and religious charities throughout the Muslim world—particularly in the Persian Gulf—raised considerably more funds for the Afghan rebels than any foreign government; Jason Burke recounts that "as little as 25 per cent of the money for the Afghan jihad was actually supplied directly by states." Saudi Arabia was heavily involved in the war effort and matched the United States' contributions dollar-for-dollar in public funds. Saudi Arabia also gathered an enormous amount of money for the Afghan mujahideen in private donations that amounted to about $20 million per month at their peak.

Other countries that supported the Mujahideen were Egypt and China. Iran on the other hand only supported the Shia Mujahideen, namely the Persian speaking Shiite Hazaras in a limited way. One of these groups was the Tehran Eight, a political union of Afghan Shi'a. They were supplied predominately by the Islamic Revolutionary Guard Corps, but Iran's support for the Hazaras nevertheless frustrated efforts for a united Mujahideen front.

Pakistan 

Shortly after the intervention, Pakistan's military ruler General Muhammad Zia-ul-Haq called for a meeting of senior military members and technocrats of his military government. At this meeting, General Zia-ul-Haq asked the Chief of Army Staff General Khalid Mahmud Arif and the Chairman of the Joint Chiefs of Staff Admiral Muhammad Shariff to lead a specialized civil-military team to formulate a geo-strategy to counter the Soviet aggression. At this meeting, the Director-General of the ISI at that time, Lieutenant-General Akhtar Abdur Rahman advocated for an idea of covert operation in Afghanistan by arming the Islamic extremist. As for Pakistan, the Soviet war with Islamist mujahideen was viewed as retaliation for the Soviet Union's long unconditional support of regional rival, India, notably during the 1965 and the 1971 wars, which led to the loss of Pakistani territory to the new state of Bangladesh.

After the Soviet deployment, Pakistan's military ruler General Muhammad Zia-ul-Haq started accepting financial aid from the Western powers to aid the Mujahideen. In 1981, following the election of US President Ronald Reagan, aid for the Mujahideen through Zia's Pakistan significantly increased, mostly due to the efforts of Texas Congressman Charlie Wilson and CIA officer Gust Avrakotos.

The Pakistan Navy were involved in the covert war coordinating foreign weapons being funnelled into Afghanistan. Some of the navy's high-ranking admirals were responsible for storing those weapons in their depots.

ISI allocated the highest percentage of covert aid to warlord Gulbuddin Hekmatyar leader of the Hezb-e-Islami faction. This was based on his record as an effective anti-Soviet military commander in Afghanistan. The other reason was that Hekmatyar and his men had "almost no grassroots support and no military base inside Afghanistan", and thus more "dependent on Zia-ul-Haq's protection and financial largesse" than other Mujahideen factions. In retaliation for Pakistan's assistance to the insurgents, the KHAD Afghan security service, under leader Mohammad Najibullah, carried out (according to the Mitrokhin Archives and other sources) a large number of operations against Pakistan. In 1987, 127 incidents resulted in 234 deaths in Pakistan. In April 1988, an ammunition depot outside the Pakistani capital of Islamabad was blown up killing 100 and injuring more than 1000 people. The KHAD and KGB were suspected in the perpetration of these acts. Soviet fighters and Democratic Republic of Afghanistan Air Force bombers occasionally bombed Pakistani villages along the Pakistani-Afghan border. The target of Soviet and Afghan fighters and bombers were Afghan refugees camps on Pakistan side of the border. These attacks are known to have caused at least 300 civilian deaths and extensive damage. Sometimes they got involved in shootings with the Pakistani jets defending the airspace.

Many secular Pakistanis outside of the government were worried about fundamentalists guerrillas in Afghanistan, such as Hekmatyar, receiving such a high amount of aid, would lead to bolster conservative Islamic forces in Pakistan and its military.

Pakistan took in millions of Afghan refugees (mostly Pashtun) fleeing the Soviet occupation. Although the refugees were controlled within Pakistan's largest province, Balochistan under then-martial law ruler General Rahimuddin Khan, the influx of so many refugees – believed to be the largest refugee population in the world – spread into several other regions.

All of this had a heavy impact on Pakistan and its effects continue to this day. Pakistan, through its support for the Mujahideen, played a significant role in the eventual withdrawal of Soviet military personnel from Afghanistan.

United States 

In the late 1970s, Pakistani intelligence officials began privately lobbying the U.S. and its allies to send material assistance to the Islamist insurgents. Pakistani President Muhammad Zia-ul-Haq's ties with the U.S. had been strained during Jimmy Carter's presidency due to Pakistan's nuclear program. Carter told National Security Adviser Zbigniew Brzezinski and Secretary of State Cyrus Vance as early as January 1979 that it was vital to "repair our relationships with Pakistan" in light of the unrest in Iran.

Carter insisted that what he termed "Soviet aggression" could not be viewed as an isolated event of limited geographical importance but had to be contested as a potential threat to US influence in the Persian Gulf region. The US was also worried about the USSR gaining access to the Indian Ocean by coming to an arrangement with Pakistan. The Soviet air base outside of Kandahar was only thirty minutes flying time by strike aircraft or naval bomber to the Persian Gulf. It "became the heart of the southernmost concentration of Soviet soldier" in the 300-year history of Russian expansion in central Asia.

Brzezinski, known for his hardline policies on the Soviet Union, became convinced by mid-1979 that the Soviets were going to invade Afghanistan regardless of U.S. policy due to the Carter administration's failure to respond aggressively to Soviet activity in Africa. Despite the risk of unintended consequences, support for the Mujahideen could be an effective way to prevent Soviet aggression beyond Afghanistan (particularly in Brzezinski's native Poland). In July 1979, Carter signed two presidential findings permitting the CIA to spend $695,000 on non-military assistance (e.g., "cash, medical equipment, and radio transmitters") and on a propaganda campaign targeting the Soviet-backed leadership of the DRA, which (in the words of Steve Coll) "seemed at the time a small beginning." Pakistan's Inter-Services Intelligence (ISI) was used as an intermediary for most of these activities to disguise the sources of support for the resistance in a program called Operation Cyclone.

The Director of Central Intelligence (DCI) Stansfield Turner and the CIA's Directorate of Operations (DO) contemplated sending lethal arms from U.S. stocks to the mujahideen as early as late August 1979, but this idea was ultimately not implemented until after the Soviet invasion in December. The first shipment of U.S. weapons intended for the Mujahideen reached Pakistan on 10 January 1980.

Democratic Congressman Charlie Wilson became obsessed with the Afghan cause. In 1982 he visited the Pakistani leadership, and was taken to a major Pakistan-based Afghan refugee camp to see first hand the conditions and the Soviet atrocities. After his visit he was able to leverage his position on the House Committee on Appropriations to encourage other Democratic congressmen to vote for CIA Afghan war money. Wilson teamed with CIA manager Gust Avrakotos and formed a team of a few dozen insiders who greatly enhanced support for the Mujahideen. With Ronald Reagan as president he then greatly expanded the program as part of the Reagan Doctrine of aiding anti-Soviet resistance movements abroad. To execute this policy, Reagan deployed CIA Special Activities Division paramilitary officers to equip the Mujahideen forces against the Soviet Army. Avrakotos hired Michael G. Vickers, the CIA's regional head who had a close relationship with Wilson and became a key architect of the strategy. The program funding was increased yearly due to lobbying by prominent U.S. politicians and government officials, such as Wilson, Gordon J. Humphrey, Fred Iklé, and William J. Casey. Under the Reagan administration, U.S. support for the Afghan Mujahideen evolved into a centerpiece of U.S. foreign policy, called the Reagan Doctrine, in which the U.S. provided military and other support to anti-communist resistance movements in Afghanistan, Angola, and Nicaragua.

The CIA gave the majority of their weapons and finances to Gulbuddin Hekmatyar's Hezb-e Islami Gulbuddin who also received the lion's share of aid from the Saudis. There was recurrent contact between the CIA and Afghan commanders, especially by agent Howard Hart, and Director of Central Intelligence William J. Casey personally visited training camps on several occasions. There was also direct Pentagon and State Department involvement which led to several major Mujahideen being welcomed to the White House for a conference in October 1985. Gulbuddin Hekmatyar declined the opportunity to meet with Ronald Reagan, but Mohammad Yunus Khalis and Abdul Haq were hosted by the president. CIA agents are also known to have given direct cash payments to Jalaluddin Haqqani.

The arms included FIM-43 Redeye and 9K32 Strela-2 shoulder-fired, antiaircraft weapons that they initially used against Soviet helicopters. Michael Pillsbury, a Pentagon official, and Vincent Cannistraro pushed the CIA to supply the Stinger missile to the rebels. This was first supplied in 1986; Wilson's good contact with Zia was instrumental in the final go-ahead for the Stinger introduction. The first Hind helicopter was brought down later that year. The CIA eventually supplied nearly 500 Stingers (some sources claim 1,500–2,000) to the Mujahideen in Afghanistan, and 250 launchers. The impact of the Stinger on the outcome of the war is contested, nevertheless some saw it more of a "force multiplier" and a morale booster.

Overall financially the U.S. offered two packages of economic assistance and military sales to support Pakistan's role in the war against the Soviet troops in Afghanistan. By the war's end more than $20 billion in U.S. funds were funnelled through Pakistan. In total, the combined U.S., Saudi, and Chinese aid to the mujahideen is valued at between $6–12 billion. Controversially $600 million went to Hekmatyar's Hezb-i-Islami party which had the dubious distinction of never winning a significant battle during the war. They also killed significant numbers of Mujahideen from other parties, and eventually took a virulently anti-Western line. Cyclone nevertheless was one of the CIA's longest and most expensive covert operations.

The full significance of the U.S. sending aid to the Mujahideen prior to the intervention is debated among scholars. Some assert that it directly, and even deliberately, provoked the Soviets to send in troops. According to Coll's dissenting analysis, however: "Contemporary memos—particularly those written in the first days after the Soviet invasion—make clear that while Brzezinski was determined to confront the Soviets in Afghanistan through covert action, he was also very worried the Soviets would prevail. ... Given this evidence and the enormous political and security costs that the invasion imposed on the Carter administration, any claim that Brzezinski lured the Soviets into Afghanistan warrants deep skepticism." A 2020 review of declassified U.S. documents by Conor Tobin in the journal Diplomatic History found that "a Soviet military intervention was neither sought nor desired by the Carter administration ... The small-scale covert program that developed in response to the increasing Soviet influence was part of a contingency plan if the Soviets did intervene militarily, as Washington would be in a better position to make it difficult for them to consolidate their position, but not designed to induce an intervention." Historian Elisabeth Leake adds, “the original provision was certainly inadequate to force a Soviet armed intervention. Instead it adhered to broader US practices of providing limited covert support to anti-communist forces worldwide”.

The US attempted to buy back the Stinger missiles, with a $55 million program launched in 1990 to buy back around 300 missiles (US$183,300 each).

United Kingdom 

Throughout the war, Britain played a significant role in support of the US and acted in concert with the U.S. government. While the US provided far more in financial and material terms to the Afghan resistance, the UK played more of a direct combat role – in particular the Special Air Service — supporting resistance groups in practical manners. This turned out to be Whitehall's most extensive covert operation since the Second World War.

Unlike the U.S., British aid to the Afghan resistance began before the Soviet invasion was actually launched, working with chosen Afghani forces during the Afghan government's close ties to the Soviet Union in the late seventies. Within three weeks of the invasion this was stepped up – cabinet secretary, Sir Robert Armstrong sent a note to Prime Minister Margaret Thatcher, Secretary of State Peter Carrington and "C", the head of MI6 arguing the case for military aid to "encourage and support resistance". Support was approved by the British government who then authorised MI6 to conduct operations in the first year of the Soviet occupation, coordinated by MI6 officers in Islamabad in liaison with the CIA and the ISI.

Thatcher visited Pakistan in October 1981 and met President Zia-ul-Haq, toured the refugee camps close to the Afghan border and then gave a speech telling the people that the hearts of the free world were with them and promised aid. The Kremlin responded to the whole incident by blasting Thatcher's "provocation aimed at stirring up anti-Soviet hysteria." Five years later two prominent Mujahideen, Gulbuddin Hekmatyar and Abdul Haq, met Thatcher in Downing Street.

MI6 helped the CIA by activating long-established British networks of contacts in Pakistan. MI6 supported the hardline Islamic group Jamiat-e Islami commanded by Ahmad Shah Massoud commander in the Panjshir Valley. With comparatively little support from Pakistan's ISI and the CIA the British were the primary means of support for Massoud. Despite the CIA's doubts on him he nevertheless became a key MI6 ally and would become an effective fighter. They sent an annual mission of two of their officers as well as military instructors to Massoud and his fighters. They stayed for three weeks or more in the mountains moving supplies to Massoud under the noses of the Pakistanis who insisted on maintaining control. The team's most important contribution was help with organisation and communication via radio equipment. The Cheltenham-based GCHQ intercepted and translated Soviet battle plan communications which was then relayed to the Afghan resistance. MI6 also helped to retrieve crashed Soviet helicopters from Afghanistan – parts of which were carried on mules.

In the Spring of 1986, Whitehall sent weapons clandestinely to some units of the Mujahideen, and made sure their origins were open to speculation. The most notable of these was the Blowpipe missile launchers. These had proved a failure in the Falklands War and had been mothballed by the British army, but were available on the international arms market. Around fifty Launchers and 300 Missiles were delivered and the system nevertheless proved ineffective; thirteen missiles were fired for no hits and it was eventually supplanted by the US Stinger missile. The mujahideen were also sent hundreds of thousands of old British army small arms, mostly Lee Enfield rifles, some of which were purchased from old Indian Army stocks. They also included limpet mines which proved the most successful, destroying Soviet barges on their side of the Amu River.

In 1983 the Special Air Service were sent in to Pakistan and worked alongside their SSG, whose commandos guided guerrilla operations in Afghanistan in the hope officers could impart their learned expertise directly to the Afghans. Britain also directly trained Afghan forces, much of which was contracted out to private security firms, a policy cleared by the British Government. The main company was Keenie Meenie Services (KMS Ltd) led by former SAS officers. In 1985 they helped train Afghans in sabotage, reconnaissance, attack planning, arson, how to use explosive devices and heavy artillery such as mortars. One of these men was a key trainer, a former senior officer in the royal Afghan army, Brigadier General Rahmatullah Safi – he trained as many as 8,000 men. As well as sending Afghan commando units to secret British bases in Oman to train; KMS even sent them to Britain. Disguised as tourists, selected junior commanders in the Mujahideen were trained in three week cycles in Scotland, northern and southern England on SAS training grounds.

The UK's role in the conflict entailed direct military involvement not only in Afghanistan, but the Central Asian republics of the Soviet Union. MI6 organised and executed "scores" of psyop attacks in Tajikistan and Uzbekistan, on Soviet troop supplies which flowed from these areas. These were the first direct Western attacks on the Soviet Union since the 1950s. MI6 also funded the spread of radical and anti-Soviet Islamic literature in the Soviet republics.

China 
During the Sino-Soviet split, strained relations between China and the USSR resulted in bloody border clashes and mutual backing for the opponent's enemies. China and Afghanistan had neutral relations with each other during the King's rule. When the pro-Soviet Afghan Communists seized power in Afghanistan in 1978, relations between China and the Afghan communists quickly turned hostile. The Afghan pro-Soviet communists supported China's then-enemy Vietnam and blamed China for supporting Afghan anti-communist militants. China responded to the Soviet war in Afghanistan by supporting the Mujahideen and ramping up their military presence near Afghanistan in Xinjiang. China acquired military equipment from America to defend itself from Soviet attack. At the same time relations with the United States had cooled considerably that by 1980 Washington had begun to supply China with a variety of weapons. They even reached an agreement of two joint tracking and listening stations in Xinjiang.

China may have given support to Tajik and Kazakh insurgents even before the 1978 coup. But the Chinese also requested before the Soviet intervention that Pakistan not permit Chinese arms it had received to be sent to the Afghan guerrillas.

The Chinese People's Liberation Army provided training, arms organisation and financial support. Anti-aircraft missiles, rocket launchers and machine guns, valued at hundreds of millions, were given to the Mujahideen by the Chinese. Throughout the war Chinese military advisers and army troops trained upwards of several thousand Mujahideen inside Xinjiang and along the Pakistani border. Overall, Chinese aid exceeded $400 million.

Pro-Soviet 
Prior to the Soviet Union's move on Afghanistan the Warsaw Pact, the Soviet's allies, were not consulted. Eastern European troops did not take part in the invasion or occupation of Afghanistan. In the end, the Soviets would have nothing more than limited political support from the Warsaw Pact countries. Romania went further and broke with its Warsaw Pact allies and abstained when the UN General Assembly voted on a resolution calling for the immediate and unconditional withdrawal of Soviet troops. The only other communist country, North Korea, also refused to endorse the invasion partly because China was supporting the Mujahideen, so they had to create a fine political balance between them and the Soviets. The allies of the Soviet Union that gave support to the intervention were Angola, East Germany, Vietnam and India.

India 
India, a close ally of the Soviet Union, endorsed the Soviet invasion of Afghanistan and by the end of the hostilities, offered to provide humanitarian assistance to the Afghan government. India did not condemn the Soviet intervention in Afghanistan as India was excessively dependent on the Soviet Union for its military and security, and it has been said that "the failure of the Indian government to publicly condemn the invasion, its support of the Soviet puppet regime of Kabul, and its hostile vision of the resistance have created major stumbling blocks in Afghan-Indian relations." India also opposed a UN resolution condemning the intervention.

Impact

Soviet personnel strengths and casualties 

Between 25 December 1979, and 15 February 1989, a total of 620,000 soldiers served with the forces in Afghanistan (though there were only 80,000–104,000 serving at one time): 525,000 in the Army, 90,000 with border troops and other KGB sub-units, 5,000 in independent formations of MVD Internal Troops, and police forces. A further 21,000 personnel were with the Soviet troop contingent over the same period doing various white collar and blue collar jobs.

The total irrecoverable personnel losses of the Soviet Armed Forces, frontier, and internal security troops came to 14,453. Soviet Army formations, units, and HQ elements lost 13,833, KGB sub-units lost 572, MVD formations lost 28, and other ministries and departments lost 20 men. During this period 312 servicemen were missing in action or taken prisoner; 119 were later freed, of whom 97 returned to the USSR and 22 went to other countries.

Of the troops deployed, 53,753 were wounded, injured, or sustained concussion and 415,932 fell sick. A high proportion of casualties were those who fell ill. This was because of local climatic and sanitary conditions, which were such that acute infections spread rapidly among the troops. There were 115,308 cases of infectious hepatitis, 31,080 of typhoid fever, and 140,665 of other diseases. Of the 11,654 who were discharged from the army after being wounded, maimed, or contracting serious diseases, 10,751 men, were left disabled.

Material losses were as follows:
 451 aircraft (includes 333 helicopters)
 147 tanks
 1,314 IFV/APCs
 433 artillery guns and mortars
 11,369 cargo and fuel tanker trucks.

In early 1987 a CIA report estimated that, from 1979 to 1986, the Soviet military spent 18 billion rubles on the war in Afghanistan (not counting other costs incurred to the Soviet state such as economic and military aid to the DRA). The CIA noted that this was the equivalent of US$50 billion ($115 billion in 2019 USD). The report credited the relatively low cost to the small size of the Soviet deployment and the fact that the supply lines to Afghanistan were very short (in some cases, easier and cheaper than internal USSR lines). Military aid to the DRA's armed forces totaled 9.124 billion rubles from 1980 to 1989 (peaking at 3.972 billion rubles in 1989). Financial and economic aid were also significant; by 1990, 75% of the Afghan state's income came from Soviet aid.

Casualties and destruction in Afghanistan 

Civilian death and destruction from the war was massive and detrimental. Estimates of Afghan civilian deaths vary from 562,000 to 2,000,000. By one estimate, at least 800,000 Afghans were killed during the Soviet occupation. 5 million Afghans fled to Pakistan and Iran, 1/3 of the prewar population of the country, and another 2 million were displaced within the country, making it one of the largest refugee crises in history. In the 1980s, half of all refugees in the world were Afghan. In his report, Felix Ermacora, the UN Special Rapporteur to Afghanistan, enumerated 32,755 killed civilians, 1,834 houses and 74 villages destroyed, and 3,308 animals killed in the first nine months of 1985. Data cited by the World Bank shows that Afghanistan's population declined from 13.4 million (1979) to 11.8 million (1989) during the decade of Soviet occupation.

R. J. Rummel, an analyst of political killings, estimated that Soviet forces were responsible for 250,000 democidal killings during the war and that the government of Afghanistan was responsible for 178,000 democidal killings. He also assumed that overall a million people died during the war. There were also a number of reports of large scale executions of hundreds of civilians by Soviet and DRA soldiers. Noor Ahmed Khalidi calculated that 876,825 Afghans were killed up until 1987. Historian John W. Dower somewhat agrees with this estimate, citing 850,000 civilian fatalities, while the military fatalities "certainly totaled over 100,000". Marek Sliwinski estimated the number of war deaths to be much higher, at a median of 1.25 million, or 9% of the entire pre-war Afghan population. Scholars John Braithwaite and Ali Wardak accept this in their estimate of 1.2 million dead Afghans. However, Siddieq Noorzoy presents an even higher figure of 1.71 million deaths during the Soviet-Afghan war. Overall, between 6.5%–11.5% of Afghanistan's population is estimated to have perished in the war. Anti-government forces were also responsible for some casualties. Rocket attacks on Kabul's residential areas caused more than 4,000 civilian deaths in 1987 according to the UN's Ermacora.

Along with fatalities were 1.2 million Afghans disabled (Mujahideen, government soldiers and noncombatants) and 3 million maimed or wounded (primarily noncombatants).

The population of Afghanistan's second largest city, Kandahar, was reduced from 200,000 before the war to no more than 25,000 inhabitants, following a months-long campaign of carpet bombing and bulldozing by the Soviets and Afghan communist soldiers in 1987. Land mines had killed 25,000 Afghans during the war and another 10–15 million land mines, most planted by Soviet and government forces, were left scattered throughout the countryside. The International Committee of the Red Cross estimated in 1994 that it would take 4,300 years to remove all the Soviet land mines in Afghanistan.

A great deal of damage was done to the civilian children population by land mines. A 2005 report estimated 3–4% of the Afghan population were disabled due to Soviet and government land mines. In the city of Quetta, a survey of refugee women and children taken shortly after the Soviet withdrawal found child mortality at 31%, and over 80% of the children refugees to be unregistered. Of children who survived, 67% were severely malnourished, with malnutrition increasing with age.

Critics of Soviet and Afghan government forces describe their effect on Afghan culture as working in three stages: first, the center of customary Afghan culture, Islam, was pushed aside; second, Soviet patterns of life, especially amongst the young, were imported; third, shared Afghan cultural characteristics were destroyed by the emphasis on the so-called Soviet nationalities system, with the outcome that the country was split into different ethnic groups, with no language, religion, or culture in common.

The Geneva Accords of 1988, which ultimately led to the withdrawal of the Soviet forces in early 1989, left the Afghan government in ruins. The accords had failed to address adequately the issue of the post-occupation period and the future governance of Afghanistan. The assumption among most Western diplomats was that the Soviet-backed government in Kabul would soon collapse; however, this was not to happen for another three years. During this time the Interim Islamic Government of Afghanistan (IIGA) was established in exile. The exclusion of key groups such as refugees and Shias, combined with major disagreements between the different Mujahideen factions, meant that the IIGA never succeeded in acting as a functional government.

Before the war, Afghanistan was already one of the world's poorest countries. The prolonged conflict left Afghanistan ranked 170 out of 174 in the UNDP's Human Development Index, making Afghanistan one of the least developed countries in the world.

Once the Soviets withdrew, US interest in Afghanistan slowly decreased over the following four years, much of it administered through the DoD Office of Humanitarian Assistance, under the then Director of HA, George M. Dykes III. With the first years of the Clinton Administration in Washington, DC, all aid ceased. The US decided not to help with reconstruction of the country, instead handing the interests of the country over to US allies Saudi Arabia and Pakistan. Pakistan quickly took advantage of this opportunity and forged relations with warlords and later the Taliban, to secure trade interests and routes. The ten years following the war saw much ecological and agrarian destruction—from wiping out the country's trees through logging practices, which has destroyed all but 2% of forest cover country-wide, to substantial uprooting of wild pistachio trees for the exportation of their roots for therapeutic uses, to opium agriculture.

Captain Tarlan Eyvazov, a soldier in the Soviet forces during the war, stated that the Afghan children's future is destined for war. Eyvazov said, "Children born in Afghanistan at the start of the war... have been brought up in war conditions, this is their way of life." Eyvazov's theory was later strengthened when the Taliban movement developed and formed from orphans or refugee children who were forced by the Soviets to flee their homes and relocate their lives in Pakistan. The swift rise to power, from the young Taliban in 1996, was the result of the disorder and civil war that had warlords running wild because of the complete breakdown of law and order in Afghanistan after the departure of the Soviets.

The CIA World Fact Book reported that as of 2004, Afghanistan still owed $8 billion in bilateral debt, mostly to Russia, however, in 2007 Russia agreed to cancel most of the debt.

Refugees 

5.5 million Afghans were made refugees by the war—a full one third of the country's pre-war population—fleeing the country to Pakistan or Iran. Another estimate states 6.2 million refugees. By the end of 1981, the UN High Commission for Refugees reported that Afghans represented the largest group of refugees in the world.

A total of 3.3 million Afghan refugees were housed in Pakistan by 1988, some of whom continue to live in the country up until today. Of this total, about 100,000 were based in the city of Peshawar, while more than 2 million were located in other parts of the northwestern province of Khyber Pakhtunkhwa (then known as the North-West Frontier Province). At the same time, close to two million Afghans were living in Iran. Over the years Pakistan and Iran have imposed tighter controls on refugees which have resulted in numerous returnees. In 2012 Pakistan banned extensions of visas to foreigners. Afghan refugees have also settled in India and became Indian citizens over time. Some also made their way into North America, the European Union, Australia, and other parts of the world. The photo of Sharbat Gula placed on National Geographic cover in 1985 became a symbol both of the 1980s Afghan conflict and of the refugee situation.

Effect on Afghan society 
The legacy of the war introduced a culture of guns, drugs and terrorism in Afghanistan. The traditional power structure was also changed in favor of the powerful Mujahideen militias.

The militarization transformed the society in the country, leading to heavily armed police, private bodyguards, and openly armed civil defense groups becoming the norm in Afghanistan both during the war and decades thereafter.

The war also altered the ethnic balance of power in the country. While Pashtuns were historically politically dominant since the modern foundation of the Durrani Empire in 1747, many of the well-organized pro-Mujahideen or pro-government groups consisted of Tajiks, Uzbeks and Hazaras. With Pashtuns increasingly politically fragmented, their influence on the state was challenged.

Aftermath

Weakening of the Soviet Union 
According to scholars Rafael Reuveny and Aseem Prakash, the war contributed to the fall of the Soviet Union by undermining the image of the Red Army as invincible, undermining Soviet legitimacy, and by creating new forms of political participation. On the other hand, the costs for the Soviet Union were not overwhelmingly large compared to other commitments. The CIA estimated in 1987 that the  costs amounted to about 2.5 percent of the Soviet military spending per year. The decision to withdraw was made based on a number of political factors. The studies about the dissolution of the Soviet Union by historians Stephen Kotkin and Vladislav Zubok identify mainly internal reasons for the collapse and mention the Afghanistan war only in passing.

The war created a cleavage between the party and the military in the Soviet Union, where the efficacy of using the Soviet military to maintain the USSR's overseas interests was now put in doubt. In the non-Russian republics, those interested in independence were emboldened by the army's defeat. Some Russian leaders began to doubt the ability to put down anti-Soviet resistance militarily (as it had in Czechoslovakia in 1968, Hungary in 1956, and East Germany in 1953). As the war was viewed as "a Soviet war fought by non Soviets against Afghans", outside of the Soviet Union it undermined the legitimacy of the Soviet Union as a trans-national political union. The war created new forms of political participation, in the form of new civil organizations of war veterans (Afgantsy), which weakened the political hegemony of the communist party. It also started the transformation of the press and media, which continued under glasnost.

Civil war 

The war did not end with the withdrawal of the Soviet Army. The Soviet Union left Afghanistan deep in winter, with intimations of panic among Kabul officials. The Afghan mujahideen were poised to attack provincial towns and cities and eventually Kabul, if necessary. General Secretary Mohammed Najibullah's government, though failing to win popular support, territory, or international recognition, was able to remain in power until 1992. Ironically, until demoralized by the defections of its senior officers, the Afghan Army had achieved a level of performance it had never reached under direct Soviet tutelage. Kabul had achieved a stalemate that exposed the Mujahideen's weaknesses, political and military. But for nearly three years, while Najibullah's government successfully defended itself against Mujahideen attacks, factions within the government had also developed connections with its opponents.

Soviet leader Mikhail Gorbachev in 1989 proposed a peace plan in cooperation with the leader of Afghanistan, Mohammad Najibullah, for the joint cutoff of Soviet and American aid to the government and guerrillas respectively, to result in a ceasefire and peace negotiations. Najibullah sought American cooperation in achieving a political solution. However the newly elected administration of George H. W. Bush rejected the plan, expecting to win the war through battle. Almost immediately after the Soviet withdrawal, the Mujahideen attacked the eastern city of Jalalabad in a plan instigated by Hamid Gul of Pakistan's Inter-Service Intelligence (ISI). Both the Americans and Pakistanis expected Jalalabad to rapidly fall to the guerrillas and lead to a final victorious attack in Kabul. The Afghan Army proved their capability without Soviet troops as they managed to restrain the Mujahideen attack, resulting in a major defeat for the Mujahideen.

The victory at Jalalabad gave Najibullah's government confidence that it could achieve a political solution, specifically one involving former communists and moderates from the opposition. Along with the Afghan and Soviet governments, China also publicly said that it supported the creation of a "broad-based" government, and Iran also supporting a negotiated peaceful solution – both China and Iran being guerrilla-backing countries. But the United States and Pakistan remained committed to a military solution. In addition, the Afghan government could claim that Jalalabad's bombardment, in which thousands of civilians lost their lives and much of the city damaged, was masterminded by the United States and Pakistan, using American weaponry.

In December 1990, the United States and the Soviet Union came close to an agreement to end arms supplies to the sides in the civil war, but a date could not be agreed. Two years after the Soviet withdrawal, the guerrillas only gained one provincial capital, Tarinkot, and its surrender was arranged by local tribal leaders. However, in March 1991, the guerrillas managed to win over a city for the first time: Khost, which was nicknamed "Little Russia" due to the city's high support of local communist officials. However the guerrillas were unable to fully defeat the Afghan Army as expected by the United States and Pakistan, and neither could the Najibullah government win on the battlefield. This situation ended following the 1991 August Coup in the Soviet Union – according to Russian publicist Andrey Karaulov, the main trigger for Najibullah losing power was Russia's refusal to sell oil products to Afghanistan in 1992 for political reasons (the new Boris Yeltsin government did not want to support the former communists), which effectively triggered an embargo. The defection of General Abdul Rashid Dostam and his Uzbek militia, in March 1992, further undermined Najibullah's control of the state. In April, Najibullah and his communist government fell to the Mujahideen, who replaced Najibullah with a new governing council for the country.

Civil war continued when the former Mujahideen guerrillas, which were never under a united command during the period from 1979 to 1992, failed to create a functioning unity government in 1992. The civil war continued and about 400,000 Afghan civilians had lost their lives in the 1990s, eventually leading to Taliban rule.

Grain production declined an average of 3.5% per year between 1978 and 1990 due to sustained fighting, instability in rural areas, prolonged drought, and deteriorated infrastructure. Soviet efforts to disrupt production in rebel-dominated areas also contributed to this decline. During the withdrawal of Soviet troops, Afghanistan's natural gas fields were capped to prevent sabotage. Restoration of gas production has been hampered by internal strife and the disruption of traditional trading relationships following the dissolution of the Soviet Union.

Extremism and international terrorism 

Following the Soviet withdrawal, some of the foreign volunteers (including Osama bin Laden's al-Qaeda) and young Afghan refugees, went on to continue violent jihad in Afghanistan, Pakistan and abroad. Some of the thousands of Afghan Arabs who left Afghanistan went on to become "capable leaders, religious ideologues and military commanders," who played "vital roles" as insurgents or terrorists in places such as Algeria, Egypt, Bosnia and Chechnya. Tens of thousands of Afghan refugee children in Pakistan were educated in madrassas "in a spirit of conservatism and religious rigor", and went on to fill the ranks and leadership of the Taliban in Afghanistan and Sipah-e-Sahaba in Pakistan. The groups embodied new varieties of Political Islam – "Salafi jihadism" among the foreign volunteers, and a "hybrid" Deobandi jihadism among the madrassa-educated.

Afghanistan's General Secretary Najibullah, before his ouster by the Mujahideen in 1992, told a visiting US academic that "Afghanistan in extremist hands would be a center of instability." It has been claimed that the chaos could have been avoided had the Bush administration been willing to support the Najibullah and Soviet proposals of a coalition government with the guerrillas, instead of a total military solution. Najibullah also told the International Herald Tribune that "if fundamentalism comes to Afghanistan, war will continue for many years. Afghanistan will be turned into a center of terrorism."

As many as 35,000 non-Afghan Muslim fighters went to Afghanistan between 1982 and 1992. Thousands more came and did not fight but attended schools with "former and future fighters".
These "Afghan-Arabs" had a marginal impact on the jihad against the Soviets, but a much greater effect after the Soviets left and in other countries. (After the Soviets left, training continued and "tens of thousands" from "some 40 nations" came to prepare for armed insurrections "to bring the struggle back home". )

The man instrumental not only in generating international support but also in inspiring these volunteers to travel to Afghanistan for the jihad was a Palestinian Muslim Brotherhood cleric, Abdullah Azzam. Touring the Muslim world and the United States, he inspired young Muslims with stories of miraculous deeds, such as Mujahideen who defeated vast columns of Soviet troops virtually single-handedly, angels riding into battle on horseback, and falling bombs intercepted by birds.

When back in the volunteer camps and training centers that he helped set up around Peshawar, Pakistan, Azzam exercised a "strong influence". He preached the importance of jihad: "those who believe that Islam can flourish [and] be victorious without Jihad, fighting, and blood are deluded and have no understanding of the nature of this religion"; of not compromising: "Jihad and the rifle alone: no negotiations, no conferences and no dialogues"; and that Afghanistan was only the beginning: jihad would "remain an individual obligation" for Muslims until all other formerly-Muslim lands—"Palestine, Bukhara, Lebanon, Chad, Eritrea, Somalia, the Philippines, Burma, South Yemen, Tashkent, Andalusia"—were reconquered. 

The volunteers also influenced each other. Many "unexpected" religious-political ideas resulted from the "cross-pollination" during the "great gathering" of Islamists from dozens of countries in the camps and training centers. One in particular was a "variant of Islamist ideology based on armed struggle and extreme religious vigour", known as Salafi jihadism.

When the Soviet Union fell shortly after their withdrawal from Afghanistan, the volunteers were "exultant", believing that—in the words of Osama bin Laden—the credit for "the dissolution of the Soviet Union ... goes to God and the mujahideen in Afghanistan ... the US had no mentionable role," (Soviet economic troubles and United States aid to Mujahideen notwithstanding). They eagerly sought to duplicate their jihad in other countries. 

Three such countries were Bosnia, Algeria and Egypt. In Bosnia the Salafi jihadist Afghan Arabs fought against Bosnian Serb and Croat militias but failed to establish a Salafi state. In Algeria and Egypt thousand of volunteers returned and fought but were even less successful. In Algeria Salafi jihadist helped lead and fight for the GIA, deliberately killing thousands of civilians. In Egypt the Al-Gama'a al-Islamiyya killed more than a thousand people between 1990 and 1997 but also failed to overthrow the government.

Spread of extremism in Pakistan 

Among the approximately three million Afghan refugees in Pakistan, thousands of children were educated in madrasa boarding schools financed by aid from the US and Gulf monarchies. Since that aid was distributed according to the conservative Islamist ideological criteria of Pakistan's President Muhammad Zia-ul-Haq and Saudi Arabia (and ignoring native Afghan traditions), the schools were part of networks of the favored Hizb-e-Islami party and the Pakistan Deobandi.  (Iran provided similar help to Shia Islamist groups and punishments to moderate Shia nationalist Afghans.)

Cut off from families and local traditions, the madrassa students were "educated to put Deobandi doctrines into action through obedience to the fatwas produced in the madrassas in a spirit of conservatism and religious rigor." As the Afghan students came of age, they formed "the mainstay" of the Taliban in Afghanistan and of the anti-Shia Sipah-e-Sahaba Sunni terror group in Pakistan. But unlike the traditionally non-violent Deobandi, this "hybrid movement" embraced the violence of jihad, and unlike the Islamists of Hizb-e-Islami they were uninterested in "islamizing modernity" of western knowledge or in western knowledge at all. The culture of religious purification, absolute obedience to leaders, and disinterest in anything else, is thought to explain the willingness of Hizb-e-Islami-trained soldiers to bombard Kabul with artillery and kill thousands of civilians, reassured by their commander that the civilians they killed would "be rewarded" in heaven if they were "good Muslims".
From 2008 to 2014 "thousands of Shia" have been killed by Sunni extremists according to Human Rights Watch.

"Blowback" of the U.S. 

Blowback, or unintended consequences of funding the Mujahideen, was said to have come to the United States in the 1993 World Trade Center bombing and the September 11 attacks. In the 1993 bombing, all of the participants in the bombing "either had served in Afghanistan or were linked to a Brooklyn-based fund-raising organ for the Afghan jihad" that was later "revealed to be al-Qaeda's de facto U.S. headquarters". Principals in the 2001 attack – Osama Bin Laden, Khalid Sheikh Mohammed – had both fought in Afghanistan, and bin Laden was a lieutenant of Abdullah Azzam. His group, al-Qaeda, returned to Afghanistan to take refuge with the Taliban after being expelled from Sudan. Before the 9/11 attack, al-Qaeda had bombed two U.S. embassies in Africa in 1998, and nearly sank the USS Cole in Yemen in 2000. However, no direct U.S. aid to Bin Laden or any of his affiliates has ever been established.

Media and popular culture 

Within Afghanistan, war rugs were a popular form of carpet designs woven by victims of the war.

Perception in Afghanistan 

The war has left a controversial legacy for Afghan people. The Mujahideen Victory Day is an annual holiday in Afghanistan on 28 April, however it is a controversial event to Afghans. Somd Afghans honor the fighters and sacrifice made by the Mujahideen to defeat a major power, but others view the victory as a prelude to the brutal 1990s civil war that divided the country politically and ethnically.

Many Afghans see their victory in the war as a source of pride. Atta Muhammad Nur, a former commander of the Mujahideen, says that the war was a victory for Afghans but also the former Soviet bloc for bringing "freedom" to peoples and states oppressed by Moscow. However, other Afghans hold the view that the infighting that followed and the rise of the Taliban undermined the victory in the war.

Role of the United States 
Pro-Mujahideen Afghans had seen the United States as the main power to help their cause in the Soviet–Afghan War. However, after the Soviet withdrawal in 1989, a growing number of Afghans started blaming the United States for miseries. This was cited as a result of continued American arming and funding of rebels against the pro-Soviet administration in Kabul. Throughout 1989 and 1990, many rebel rocket attacks were fired, nowhere near military targets, that killed dozens of Afghan civilians. Many Afghans also reportedly felt that the U.S. caused the rise of the Taliban by sending billions of dollars in funding for the rebels while leaving the country in Pakistan's hands after 1992. One Afghan ex-prisoner who was affiliated with the U.S. Embassy in Kabul told the Chicago Tribune in 2001:

Perception in the former Soviet Union 

The war left a long legacy in the former Soviet Union and following its collapse. Along with losses, it brought physical disabilities and widespread drug addiction throughout the USSR.

The remembrance of Soviet soldiers killed in Afghanistan and elsewhere internationally are commemorated annually on 15 February in Russia, Ukraine and Belarus. Veterans of the war are often referred to as афганцы (Afgantsy) in Russian.

Russian Federation 
Commemorating the intervention of 25 December 1979, in December 2009, veterans of the Soviet war in Afghanistan were honoured by the Duma or Parliament of the Russian Federation. On 25 December, the lower house of the parliament defended the Soviet war in Afghanistan on the 30th anniversary of its start, and praised the veterans of the conflict. Differing assessments of the war "mustn't erode the Russian people's respect for the soldiers who honestly fulfilled their duty in implementing tasks to combat international terrorism and religious extremists".

Duma member Semyon Bagdasarov (Just Russia) advocated that Russia had to reject Western calls for stronger assistance to the US-led ISAF-coalition in Afghanistan and also had to establish contacts with the "anti-Western forces"; the Taliban, in case they regain power.

In November 2018, Russian lawmakers from United Russia and Communist parties jointly approved a draft resolution seeking to justify the Soviet–Afghan War as well as declare null and void the 1989 resolution passed by the Congress of People's Deputies of the Soviet Union which condemned the intervention. Communist lawmaker Nikolay Kharitonov hailed the decision as a victory for "historical truth".

Ukraine 

About 25 percent of Soviet servicemen in Afghanistan were Ukrainian, numbering 160,000 of which more than 3,000 died and dozens more went missing.

Uzbekistan 
The war affected many families in post-Soviet Uzbekistan who had lost children. Some 64,500 young men from the Uzbek SSR were drafted in the war. At least 1,522 were killed and more than 2,500 left disabled. The former Uzbekistani president Islam Karimov described the Afghan war as a "major mistake" of the Soviet Union.

Belarus 
The Soviet–Afghan War has caused grief in the memories of Belarusians, but apparently remains a topic rarely discussed in public. It remains the last war the country took part in. 28,832 Belarusian natives were involved in the campaign and 732 died. Most casualties were under 20 years old.

The Soviet invasion is considered by many Belarusians as a shameful act, and some veterans have refused to accept medals. Many veterans have had cold relations with the Belarusian regime of Alexander Lukashenko, accusing the government of depriving them of benefits. One Afghanistan veteran, Mikalaj Autukhovich, is considered a political prisoner of the present regime of Belarus.

Moldova 
Around 12,500 residents of the Moldavian SSR served during the war. Of those, 301 Moldovans died in the war. The Union of Veterans of the War in Afghanistan of the Republic of Moldova is a veteran's group based in Moldova that advocates for the well being of veterans. On 15 May 2000, after the Government's initiative to abolish benefits for veterans of the war in Afghanistan, sympathizers went to Great National Assembly Square. In 2001, the Party of Communists of the Republic of Moldova, which came to power, radically changed the position of all veterans in the country. 15 February is celebrated as the Day of Commemoration of those killed in the War in Afghanistan. The main ceremony is held at the memorial "Sons of the Motherland – Eternal Memory".

See also 

 History of Afghanistan (1978–1992)
 Afghanistan conflict (1978–present)
 Soviet involvement in Indo-Pakistan War of 1971
 Pakistan–Soviet Union relations
 Women in the Soviet–Afghan War
 Spetsnaz (Russian Special Purpose Regiments)
 Political philosophies and doctrines
 Brezhnev Doctrine
 Carter Doctrine
 Interventionism
 Reagan Doctrine
 Zia Doctrine
 Environmental impacts of war in Afghanistan

Notes

References

Bibliography 

 
 
 
 
 
  
 
 
 
 
 
 
 
 
 
 
 
 
  (free online access courtesy of UCP).

Historiography and memory
 
 Galbas, Michael. " 'We Are Heroes': The Homogenising Glorification of the Memories on the Soviet–Afghan War in Present Russia." in Conflict Veterans: Discourses and Living Contexts of an Emerging Social Group (2018): 134+. online
 Gibbs, David N. "Reassessing Soviet motives for invading Afghanistan: A declassified history." Critical Asian Studies 38.2 (2006): 239-263. online
 

 
Afghanistan conflict (1978–present)
Cold War conflicts
1979 in Afghanistan
1980s in Afghanistan
Conflicts in 1979
1980s conflicts
Invasions of Afghanistan
Invasions by the Soviet Union
Soviet military occupations
Wars involving Afghanistan
Anti-communism in Pakistan
Afghanistan
Wars involving Pakistan
Guerrilla warfare
Chemical warfare by conflict
Proxy wars
Cold War military history of the Soviet Union
Anti-communism in Afghanistan
Communism in Afghanistan
Islamism in Afghanistan
1979 in the Soviet Union
1980s in the Soviet Union
Afghanistan–Soviet Union relations
History of Islam in Afghanistan
Terrorism in Pakistan